

572001–572100 

|-bgcolor=#d6d6d6
| 572001 ||  || — || March 7, 2014 || Kitt Peak || Spacewatch ||  || align=right | 1.9 km || 
|-id=002 bgcolor=#d6d6d6
| 572002 ||  || — || January 11, 2008 || Kitt Peak || Spacewatch ||  || align=right | 1.9 km || 
|-id=003 bgcolor=#d6d6d6
| 572003 ||  || — || February 28, 2014 || Haleakala || Pan-STARRS ||  || align=right | 2.0 km || 
|-id=004 bgcolor=#d6d6d6
| 572004 ||  || — || January 10, 2008 || Mount Lemmon || Mount Lemmon Survey ||  || align=right | 2.4 km || 
|-id=005 bgcolor=#d6d6d6
| 572005 ||  || — || January 11, 2008 || Mount Lemmon || Mount Lemmon Survey ||  || align=right | 2.7 km || 
|-id=006 bgcolor=#d6d6d6
| 572006 ||  || — || January 11, 2008 || Kitt Peak || Spacewatch ||  || align=right | 2.6 km || 
|-id=007 bgcolor=#d6d6d6
| 572007 ||  || — || January 13, 2008 || Kitt Peak || Spacewatch ||  || align=right | 2.8 km || 
|-id=008 bgcolor=#d6d6d6
| 572008 ||  || — || January 13, 2008 || Kitt Peak || Spacewatch ||  || align=right | 2.2 km || 
|-id=009 bgcolor=#fefefe
| 572009 ||  || — || January 11, 2008 || Kitt Peak || Spacewatch ||  || align=right data-sort-value="0.68" | 680 m || 
|-id=010 bgcolor=#d6d6d6
| 572010 ||  || — || January 11, 2008 || Mount Lemmon || Mount Lemmon Survey ||  || align=right | 1.8 km || 
|-id=011 bgcolor=#d6d6d6
| 572011 ||  || — || January 10, 2008 || Mount Lemmon || Mount Lemmon Survey ||  || align=right | 2.4 km || 
|-id=012 bgcolor=#d6d6d6
| 572012 ||  || — || January 12, 2008 || Kitt Peak || Spacewatch ||  || align=right | 2.3 km || 
|-id=013 bgcolor=#fefefe
| 572013 ||  || — || January 16, 2008 || Mount Lemmon || Mount Lemmon Survey ||  || align=right data-sort-value="0.97" | 970 m || 
|-id=014 bgcolor=#d6d6d6
| 572014 ||  || — || July 31, 2000 || Cerro Tololo || M. W. Buie, S. D. Kern ||  || align=right | 2.3 km || 
|-id=015 bgcolor=#d6d6d6
| 572015 ||  || — || January 31, 1997 || Kitt Peak || Spacewatch ||  || align=right | 2.8 km || 
|-id=016 bgcolor=#fefefe
| 572016 ||  || — || January 16, 2008 || Kitt Peak || Spacewatch ||  || align=right data-sort-value="0.89" | 890 m || 
|-id=017 bgcolor=#E9E9E9
| 572017 ||  || — || January 17, 2008 || Mount Lemmon || Mount Lemmon Survey ||  || align=right | 1.2 km || 
|-id=018 bgcolor=#d6d6d6
| 572018 ||  || — || July 31, 2005 || Palomar || NEAT ||  || align=right | 3.8 km || 
|-id=019 bgcolor=#d6d6d6
| 572019 ||  || — || January 18, 2008 || Kitt Peak || Spacewatch || Tj (2.99) || align=right | 3.1 km || 
|-id=020 bgcolor=#d6d6d6
| 572020 ||  || — || September 26, 2006 || Catalina || CSS ||  || align=right | 3.0 km || 
|-id=021 bgcolor=#d6d6d6
| 572021 ||  || — || December 17, 2007 || Mount Lemmon || Mount Lemmon Survey ||  || align=right | 3.2 km || 
|-id=022 bgcolor=#d6d6d6
| 572022 ||  || — || January 30, 2008 || Kitt Peak || Spacewatch ||  || align=right | 2.8 km || 
|-id=023 bgcolor=#d6d6d6
| 572023 ||  || — || January 30, 2008 || Mount Lemmon || Mount Lemmon Survey ||  || align=right | 2.2 km || 
|-id=024 bgcolor=#fefefe
| 572024 ||  || — || January 31, 2008 || Mount Lemmon || Mount Lemmon Survey ||  || align=right data-sort-value="0.80" | 800 m || 
|-id=025 bgcolor=#E9E9E9
| 572025 ||  || — || December 19, 2007 || Mount Lemmon || Mount Lemmon Survey ||  || align=right data-sort-value="0.99" | 990 m || 
|-id=026 bgcolor=#d6d6d6
| 572026 ||  || — || January 16, 2008 || Kitt Peak || Spacewatch ||  || align=right | 2.1 km || 
|-id=027 bgcolor=#d6d6d6
| 572027 ||  || — || January 19, 2008 || Mount Lemmon || Mount Lemmon Survey ||  || align=right | 2.7 km || 
|-id=028 bgcolor=#d6d6d6
| 572028 ||  || — || January 30, 2008 || Mount Lemmon || Mount Lemmon Survey ||  || align=right | 1.9 km || 
|-id=029 bgcolor=#d6d6d6
| 572029 ||  || — || January 18, 2008 || Kitt Peak || Spacewatch ||  || align=right | 3.0 km || 
|-id=030 bgcolor=#d6d6d6
| 572030 ||  || — || September 12, 2017 || Haleakala || Pan-STARRS ||  || align=right | 3.1 km || 
|-id=031 bgcolor=#d6d6d6
| 572031 ||  || — || April 17, 2009 || Kitt Peak || Spacewatch ||  || align=right | 2.3 km || 
|-id=032 bgcolor=#d6d6d6
| 572032 ||  || — || January 30, 2008 || Kitt Peak || Spacewatch ||  || align=right | 2.7 km || 
|-id=033 bgcolor=#d6d6d6
| 572033 ||  || — || February 2, 2008 || Kitt Peak || Spacewatch ||  || align=right | 3.2 km || 
|-id=034 bgcolor=#d6d6d6
| 572034 ||  || — || December 17, 2007 || Mount Lemmon || Mount Lemmon Survey ||  || align=right | 2.8 km || 
|-id=035 bgcolor=#d6d6d6
| 572035 ||  || — || February 2, 2008 || Mount Lemmon || Mount Lemmon Survey ||  || align=right | 2.4 km || 
|-id=036 bgcolor=#E9E9E9
| 572036 ||  || — || February 3, 2008 || Kitt Peak || Spacewatch ||  || align=right data-sort-value="0.74" | 740 m || 
|-id=037 bgcolor=#fefefe
| 572037 ||  || — || February 3, 2008 || Kitt Peak || Spacewatch ||  || align=right data-sort-value="0.75" | 750 m || 
|-id=038 bgcolor=#E9E9E9
| 572038 ||  || — || February 3, 2008 || Kitt Peak || Spacewatch ||  || align=right | 1.0 km || 
|-id=039 bgcolor=#d6d6d6
| 572039 ||  || — || February 3, 2008 || Kitt Peak || Spacewatch ||  || align=right | 3.3 km || 
|-id=040 bgcolor=#d6d6d6
| 572040 ||  || — || February 8, 2008 || Gaisberg || R. Gierlinger ||  || align=right | 2.3 km || 
|-id=041 bgcolor=#d6d6d6
| 572041 ||  || — || February 2, 2008 || Kitt Peak || Spacewatch ||  || align=right | 2.6 km || 
|-id=042 bgcolor=#d6d6d6
| 572042 ||  || — || January 11, 2008 || Kitt Peak || Spacewatch ||  || align=right | 2.5 km || 
|-id=043 bgcolor=#d6d6d6
| 572043 ||  || — || February 2, 2008 || Kitt Peak || Spacewatch ||  || align=right | 2.4 km || 
|-id=044 bgcolor=#d6d6d6
| 572044 ||  || — || January 10, 2008 || Kitt Peak || Spacewatch ||  || align=right | 2.7 km || 
|-id=045 bgcolor=#d6d6d6
| 572045 ||  || — || February 2, 2008 || Kitt Peak || Spacewatch ||  || align=right | 3.3 km || 
|-id=046 bgcolor=#E9E9E9
| 572046 ||  || — || February 2, 2008 || Kitt Peak || Spacewatch ||  || align=right data-sort-value="0.78" | 780 m || 
|-id=047 bgcolor=#d6d6d6
| 572047 ||  || — || December 30, 2007 || Kitt Peak || Spacewatch ||  || align=right | 2.0 km || 
|-id=048 bgcolor=#d6d6d6
| 572048 ||  || — || February 7, 2008 || Mount Lemmon || Mount Lemmon Survey ||  || align=right | 2.1 km || 
|-id=049 bgcolor=#fefefe
| 572049 ||  || — || January 18, 2008 || Kitt Peak || Spacewatch ||  || align=right data-sort-value="0.69" | 690 m || 
|-id=050 bgcolor=#d6d6d6
| 572050 ||  || — || February 7, 2008 || Mount Lemmon || Mount Lemmon Survey ||  || align=right | 2.0 km || 
|-id=051 bgcolor=#d6d6d6
| 572051 ||  || — || November 22, 2006 || Kitt Peak || Spacewatch ||  || align=right | 2.4 km || 
|-id=052 bgcolor=#d6d6d6
| 572052 ||  || — || October 19, 2007 || Mount Lemmon || Mount Lemmon Survey ||  || align=right | 3.2 km || 
|-id=053 bgcolor=#d6d6d6
| 572053 ||  || — || February 10, 2008 || Catalina || CSS ||  || align=right | 2.4 km || 
|-id=054 bgcolor=#d6d6d6
| 572054 ||  || — || February 7, 2008 || Kitt Peak || Spacewatch ||  || align=right | 2.1 km || 
|-id=055 bgcolor=#d6d6d6
| 572055 ||  || — || February 7, 2008 || Kitt Peak || Spacewatch ||  || align=right | 2.5 km || 
|-id=056 bgcolor=#d6d6d6
| 572056 ||  || — || April 1, 2003 || Apache Point || SDSS Collaboration ||  || align=right | 2.6 km || 
|-id=057 bgcolor=#fefefe
| 572057 ||  || — || December 16, 1995 || Kitt Peak || Spacewatch ||  || align=right data-sort-value="0.86" | 860 m || 
|-id=058 bgcolor=#E9E9E9
| 572058 ||  || — || February 8, 2008 || Mount Lemmon || Mount Lemmon Survey ||  || align=right data-sort-value="0.75" | 750 m || 
|-id=059 bgcolor=#fefefe
| 572059 ||  || — || February 8, 2008 || Mount Lemmon || Mount Lemmon Survey || H || align=right data-sort-value="0.75" | 750 m || 
|-id=060 bgcolor=#fefefe
| 572060 ||  || — || September 18, 2006 || Kitt Peak || Spacewatch ||  || align=right data-sort-value="0.65" | 650 m || 
|-id=061 bgcolor=#d6d6d6
| 572061 ||  || — || February 9, 2008 || Kitt Peak || Spacewatch ||  || align=right | 2.1 km || 
|-id=062 bgcolor=#E9E9E9
| 572062 ||  || — || February 9, 2008 || Mount Lemmon || Mount Lemmon Survey ||  || align=right | 2.0 km || 
|-id=063 bgcolor=#E9E9E9
| 572063 ||  || — || February 9, 2008 || Mount Lemmon || Mount Lemmon Survey ||  || align=right | 1.1 km || 
|-id=064 bgcolor=#d6d6d6
| 572064 ||  || — || February 9, 2008 || Mount Lemmon || Mount Lemmon Survey ||  || align=right | 2.8 km || 
|-id=065 bgcolor=#d6d6d6
| 572065 ||  || — || March 27, 2003 || Kitt Peak || Spacewatch || EOS || align=right | 2.7 km || 
|-id=066 bgcolor=#d6d6d6
| 572066 ||  || — || February 10, 2008 || Kitt Peak || Spacewatch ||  || align=right | 2.4 km || 
|-id=067 bgcolor=#d6d6d6
| 572067 ||  || — || February 10, 2008 || Kitt Peak || Spacewatch ||  || align=right | 2.5 km || 
|-id=068 bgcolor=#d6d6d6
| 572068 ||  || — || February 10, 2008 || Kitt Peak || Spacewatch ||  || align=right | 2.7 km || 
|-id=069 bgcolor=#d6d6d6
| 572069 ||  || — || February 10, 2008 || Kitt Peak || Spacewatch ||  || align=right | 2.6 km || 
|-id=070 bgcolor=#E9E9E9
| 572070 ||  || — || January 15, 2008 || Mount Lemmon || Mount Lemmon Survey ||  || align=right data-sort-value="0.66" | 660 m || 
|-id=071 bgcolor=#d6d6d6
| 572071 ||  || — || February 10, 2008 || Lulin || LUSS || EUP || align=right | 3.3 km || 
|-id=072 bgcolor=#d6d6d6
| 572072 ||  || — || October 20, 1995 || Kitt Peak || Spacewatch ||  || align=right | 2.3 km || 
|-id=073 bgcolor=#d6d6d6
| 572073 ||  || — || February 8, 2008 || Kitt Peak || Spacewatch ||  || align=right | 2.5 km || 
|-id=074 bgcolor=#d6d6d6
| 572074 ||  || — || February 8, 2008 || Kitt Peak || Spacewatch ||  || align=right | 2.7 km || 
|-id=075 bgcolor=#d6d6d6
| 572075 ||  || — || February 8, 2008 || Kitt Peak || Spacewatch ||  || align=right | 2.1 km || 
|-id=076 bgcolor=#d6d6d6
| 572076 ||  || — || September 19, 2001 || Apache Point || SDSS Collaboration ||  || align=right | 2.4 km || 
|-id=077 bgcolor=#d6d6d6
| 572077 ||  || — || February 8, 2008 || Kitt Peak || Spacewatch ||  || align=right | 2.1 km || 
|-id=078 bgcolor=#d6d6d6
| 572078 ||  || — || February 9, 2008 || Kitt Peak || Spacewatch ||  || align=right | 2.2 km || 
|-id=079 bgcolor=#d6d6d6
| 572079 ||  || — || February 9, 2008 || Mount Lemmon || Mount Lemmon Survey ||  || align=right | 2.9 km || 
|-id=080 bgcolor=#d6d6d6
| 572080 ||  || — || February 2, 2008 || Kitt Peak || Spacewatch ||  || align=right | 2.4 km || 
|-id=081 bgcolor=#d6d6d6
| 572081 ||  || — || February 9, 2008 || Kitt Peak || Spacewatch ||  || align=right | 3.1 km || 
|-id=082 bgcolor=#E9E9E9
| 572082 ||  || — || February 9, 2008 || Kitt Peak || Spacewatch ||  || align=right data-sort-value="0.94" | 940 m || 
|-id=083 bgcolor=#d6d6d6
| 572083 ||  || — || September 13, 2005 || Kitt Peak || Spacewatch ||  || align=right | 2.6 km || 
|-id=084 bgcolor=#d6d6d6
| 572084 ||  || — || February 9, 2008 || Kitt Peak || Spacewatch ||  || align=right | 3.4 km || 
|-id=085 bgcolor=#E9E9E9
| 572085 ||  || — || February 9, 2008 || Kitt Peak || Spacewatch ||  || align=right data-sort-value="0.77" | 770 m || 
|-id=086 bgcolor=#d6d6d6
| 572086 ||  || — || February 9, 2008 || Catalina || CSS ||  || align=right | 3.4 km || 
|-id=087 bgcolor=#d6d6d6
| 572087 ||  || — || December 14, 1996 || Kitt Peak || Spacewatch ||  || align=right | 2.6 km || 
|-id=088 bgcolor=#d6d6d6
| 572088 ||  || — || February 10, 2008 || Kitt Peak || Spacewatch ||  || align=right | 2.4 km || 
|-id=089 bgcolor=#d6d6d6
| 572089 ||  || — || February 10, 2008 || Kitt Peak || Spacewatch ||  || align=right | 2.5 km || 
|-id=090 bgcolor=#d6d6d6
| 572090 ||  || — || January 16, 2008 || Kitt Peak || Spacewatch ||  || align=right | 2.7 km || 
|-id=091 bgcolor=#d6d6d6
| 572091 ||  || — || January 12, 2008 || Mount Lemmon || Mount Lemmon Survey ||  || align=right | 3.0 km || 
|-id=092 bgcolor=#E9E9E9
| 572092 ||  || — || February 2, 2008 || Mount Lemmon || Mount Lemmon Survey ||  || align=right data-sort-value="0.98" | 980 m || 
|-id=093 bgcolor=#d6d6d6
| 572093 ||  || — || February 13, 2008 || Mount Lemmon || Mount Lemmon Survey ||  || align=right | 2.7 km || 
|-id=094 bgcolor=#d6d6d6
| 572094 ||  || — || February 13, 2008 || Kitt Peak || Spacewatch ||  || align=right | 2.6 km || 
|-id=095 bgcolor=#d6d6d6
| 572095 ||  || — || February 2, 2008 || Catalina || CSS ||  || align=right | 2.8 km || 
|-id=096 bgcolor=#E9E9E9
| 572096 ||  || — || October 2, 2006 || Mount Lemmon || Mount Lemmon Survey ||  || align=right | 1.0 km || 
|-id=097 bgcolor=#d6d6d6
| 572097 ||  || — || February 10, 2008 || Kitt Peak || Spacewatch ||  || align=right | 1.5 km || 
|-id=098 bgcolor=#d6d6d6
| 572098 ||  || — || February 2, 2008 || Kitt Peak || Spacewatch || HYG || align=right | 2.4 km || 
|-id=099 bgcolor=#d6d6d6
| 572099 ||  || — || February 13, 2008 || Catalina || CSS ||  || align=right | 2.7 km || 
|-id=100 bgcolor=#d6d6d6
| 572100 ||  || — || May 21, 2015 || Haleakala || Pan-STARRS ||  || align=right | 2.5 km || 
|}

572101–572200 

|-bgcolor=#fefefe
| 572101 ||  || — || February 9, 2008 || Mount Lemmon || Mount Lemmon Survey ||  || align=right data-sort-value="0.86" | 860 m || 
|-id=102 bgcolor=#d6d6d6
| 572102 ||  || — || February 2, 2008 || Kitt Peak || Spacewatch ||  || align=right | 2.5 km || 
|-id=103 bgcolor=#d6d6d6
| 572103 ||  || — || February 8, 2008 || Kitt Peak || Spacewatch ||  || align=right | 3.0 km || 
|-id=104 bgcolor=#d6d6d6
| 572104 ||  || — || February 2, 2008 || Kitt Peak || Spacewatch ||  || align=right | 2.7 km || 
|-id=105 bgcolor=#d6d6d6
| 572105 ||  || — || February 9, 2008 || Mount Lemmon || Mount Lemmon Survey ||  || align=right | 2.8 km || 
|-id=106 bgcolor=#d6d6d6
| 572106 ||  || — || September 24, 2011 || Haleakala || Pan-STARRS ||  || align=right | 2.7 km || 
|-id=107 bgcolor=#d6d6d6
| 572107 ||  || — || February 24, 2014 || Haleakala || Pan-STARRS ||  || align=right | 2.5 km || 
|-id=108 bgcolor=#d6d6d6
| 572108 ||  || — || March 8, 2014 || Mount Lemmon || Mount Lemmon Survey ||  || align=right | 2.4 km || 
|-id=109 bgcolor=#d6d6d6
| 572109 ||  || — || August 27, 2011 || Haleakala || Pan-STARRS ||  || align=right | 2.1 km || 
|-id=110 bgcolor=#d6d6d6
| 572110 ||  || — || February 26, 2014 || Haleakala || Pan-STARRS ||  || align=right | 2.9 km || 
|-id=111 bgcolor=#d6d6d6
| 572111 ||  || — || February 7, 2008 || Mount Lemmon || Mount Lemmon Survey ||  || align=right | 2.3 km || 
|-id=112 bgcolor=#d6d6d6
| 572112 ||  || — || January 22, 2013 || Mount Lemmon || Mount Lemmon Survey ||  || align=right | 2.3 km || 
|-id=113 bgcolor=#d6d6d6
| 572113 ||  || — || January 10, 2013 || Observatorio Cala || B. Linero, I. d. l. Cueva ||  || align=right | 2.6 km || 
|-id=114 bgcolor=#d6d6d6
| 572114 ||  || — || February 12, 2008 || Mount Lemmon || Mount Lemmon Survey ||  || align=right | 2.0 km || 
|-id=115 bgcolor=#fefefe
| 572115 ||  || — || February 13, 2008 || Kitt Peak || Spacewatch ||  || align=right data-sort-value="0.86" | 860 m || 
|-id=116 bgcolor=#E9E9E9
| 572116 ||  || — || February 9, 2008 || Mount Lemmon || Mount Lemmon Survey ||  || align=right data-sort-value="0.78" | 780 m || 
|-id=117 bgcolor=#d6d6d6
| 572117 ||  || — || December 23, 2012 || Haleakala || Pan-STARRS ||  || align=right | 3.0 km || 
|-id=118 bgcolor=#d6d6d6
| 572118 ||  || — || February 14, 2008 || Mount Lemmon || Mount Lemmon Survey ||  || align=right | 2.5 km || 
|-id=119 bgcolor=#fefefe
| 572119 ||  || — || October 6, 2013 || Catalina || CSS ||  || align=right data-sort-value="0.65" | 650 m || 
|-id=120 bgcolor=#d6d6d6
| 572120 ||  || — || January 12, 2013 || Mount Lemmon || Mount Lemmon Survey ||  || align=right | 2.3 km || 
|-id=121 bgcolor=#d6d6d6
| 572121 ||  || — || September 23, 2011 || Haleakala || Pan-STARRS ||  || align=right | 2.4 km || 
|-id=122 bgcolor=#E9E9E9
| 572122 ||  || — || February 7, 2008 || Kitt Peak || Spacewatch ||  || align=right data-sort-value="0.70" | 700 m || 
|-id=123 bgcolor=#d6d6d6
| 572123 ||  || — || September 23, 2011 || Charleston || R. Holmes ||  || align=right | 2.7 km || 
|-id=124 bgcolor=#d6d6d6
| 572124 ||  || — || February 11, 2008 || Mount Lemmon || Mount Lemmon Survey ||  || align=right | 3.1 km || 
|-id=125 bgcolor=#d6d6d6
| 572125 ||  || — || February 2, 2008 || Mount Lemmon || Mount Lemmon Survey ||  || align=right | 2.9 km || 
|-id=126 bgcolor=#d6d6d6
| 572126 ||  || — || January 13, 2008 || Kitt Peak || Spacewatch ||  || align=right | 2.3 km || 
|-id=127 bgcolor=#d6d6d6
| 572127 ||  || — || February 9, 2008 || Kitt Peak || Spacewatch ||  || align=right | 2.9 km || 
|-id=128 bgcolor=#d6d6d6
| 572128 ||  || — || January 13, 2008 || Kitt Peak || Spacewatch ||  || align=right | 3.1 km || 
|-id=129 bgcolor=#d6d6d6
| 572129 ||  || — || January 13, 2008 || Kitt Peak || Spacewatch ||  || align=right | 2.0 km || 
|-id=130 bgcolor=#d6d6d6
| 572130 ||  || — || August 26, 2016 || Haleakala || Pan-STARRS ||  || align=right | 2.8 km || 
|-id=131 bgcolor=#d6d6d6
| 572131 ||  || — || March 8, 2014 || Mount Lemmon || Mount Lemmon Survey ||  || align=right | 2.5 km || 
|-id=132 bgcolor=#d6d6d6
| 572132 ||  || — || February 13, 2008 || Mount Lemmon || Mount Lemmon Survey ||  || align=right | 2.5 km || 
|-id=133 bgcolor=#d6d6d6
| 572133 ||  || — || February 13, 2008 || Mount Lemmon || Mount Lemmon Survey ||  || align=right | 2.4 km || 
|-id=134 bgcolor=#d6d6d6
| 572134 ||  || — || February 8, 2008 || Mount Lemmon || Mount Lemmon Survey ||  || align=right | 3.0 km || 
|-id=135 bgcolor=#d6d6d6
| 572135 ||  || — || August 10, 2016 || Haleakala || Pan-STARRS ||  || align=right | 2.4 km || 
|-id=136 bgcolor=#d6d6d6
| 572136 ||  || — || December 14, 2013 || Haleakala || Pan-STARRS ||  || align=right | 3.0 km || 
|-id=137 bgcolor=#d6d6d6
| 572137 ||  || — || April 1, 2014 || Mount Lemmon || Mount Lemmon Survey ||  || align=right | 2.4 km || 
|-id=138 bgcolor=#d6d6d6
| 572138 ||  || — || May 7, 2014 || Haleakala || Pan-STARRS ||  || align=right | 1.9 km || 
|-id=139 bgcolor=#d6d6d6
| 572139 ||  || — || November 18, 2017 || Haleakala || Pan-STARRS ||  || align=right | 2.4 km || 
|-id=140 bgcolor=#fefefe
| 572140 ||  || — || November 19, 2014 || Mount Lemmon || Mount Lemmon Survey ||  || align=right data-sort-value="0.72" | 720 m || 
|-id=141 bgcolor=#d6d6d6
| 572141 ||  || — || May 18, 2015 || Haleakala || Pan-STARRS ||  || align=right | 2.0 km || 
|-id=142 bgcolor=#d6d6d6
| 572142 ||  || — || February 8, 2008 || Kitt Peak || Spacewatch ||  || align=right | 2.4 km || 
|-id=143 bgcolor=#d6d6d6
| 572143 ||  || — || February 9, 2008 || Kitt Peak || Spacewatch ||  || align=right | 2.2 km || 
|-id=144 bgcolor=#d6d6d6
| 572144 ||  || — || February 3, 2008 || Kitt Peak || Spacewatch ||  || align=right | 2.1 km || 
|-id=145 bgcolor=#d6d6d6
| 572145 ||  || — || February 1, 2008 || Kitt Peak || Spacewatch ||  || align=right | 1.9 km || 
|-id=146 bgcolor=#d6d6d6
| 572146 ||  || — || February 14, 2008 || Mount Lemmon || Mount Lemmon Survey ||  || align=right | 2.4 km || 
|-id=147 bgcolor=#d6d6d6
| 572147 ||  || — || February 2, 2008 || Kitt Peak || Spacewatch ||  || align=right | 3.0 km || 
|-id=148 bgcolor=#d6d6d6
| 572148 ||  || — || February 2, 2008 || Kitt Peak || Spacewatch ||  || align=right | 2.4 km || 
|-id=149 bgcolor=#d6d6d6
| 572149 ||  || — || February 10, 2008 || Kitt Peak || Spacewatch ||  || align=right | 2.1 km || 
|-id=150 bgcolor=#d6d6d6
| 572150 ||  || — || February 9, 2008 || Mount Lemmon || Mount Lemmon Survey ||  || align=right | 2.5 km || 
|-id=151 bgcolor=#d6d6d6
| 572151 ||  || — || February 10, 2008 || Kitt Peak || Spacewatch ||  || align=right | 2.3 km || 
|-id=152 bgcolor=#fefefe
| 572152 ||  || — || February 10, 2008 || Kitt Peak || Spacewatch ||  || align=right data-sort-value="0.52" | 520 m || 
|-id=153 bgcolor=#E9E9E9
| 572153 ||  || — || February 12, 2008 || Mount Lemmon || Mount Lemmon Survey ||  || align=right data-sort-value="0.98" | 980 m || 
|-id=154 bgcolor=#E9E9E9
| 572154 ||  || — || February 7, 2008 || Kitt Peak || Spacewatch ||  || align=right data-sort-value="0.97" | 970 m || 
|-id=155 bgcolor=#d6d6d6
| 572155 ||  || — || January 30, 2008 || Mount Lemmon || Mount Lemmon Survey ||  || align=right | 2.5 km || 
|-id=156 bgcolor=#d6d6d6
| 572156 ||  || — || January 30, 2008 || Mount Lemmon || Mount Lemmon Survey || Tj (2.99) || align=right | 3.4 km || 
|-id=157 bgcolor=#d6d6d6
| 572157 ||  || — || July 4, 2005 || Mount Lemmon || Mount Lemmon Survey ||  || align=right | 3.3 km || 
|-id=158 bgcolor=#d6d6d6
| 572158 ||  || — || January 12, 2008 || Kitt Peak || Spacewatch ||  || align=right | 2.5 km || 
|-id=159 bgcolor=#d6d6d6
| 572159 ||  || — || January 11, 2008 || Kitt Peak || Spacewatch ||  || align=right | 3.3 km || 
|-id=160 bgcolor=#fefefe
| 572160 ||  || — || January 8, 2008 || Gaisberg || R. Gierlinger || MAS || align=right data-sort-value="0.67" | 670 m || 
|-id=161 bgcolor=#d6d6d6
| 572161 ||  || — || November 18, 2006 || Kitt Peak || Spacewatch ||  || align=right | 2.4 km || 
|-id=162 bgcolor=#d6d6d6
| 572162 ||  || — || January 11, 2008 || Kitt Peak || Spacewatch ||  || align=right | 2.9 km || 
|-id=163 bgcolor=#d6d6d6
| 572163 ||  || — || February 9, 2008 || Kitt Peak || Spacewatch ||  || align=right | 2.4 km || 
|-id=164 bgcolor=#d6d6d6
| 572164 ||  || — || February 10, 2008 || Kitt Peak || Spacewatch ||  || align=right | 2.8 km || 
|-id=165 bgcolor=#fefefe
| 572165 ||  || — || November 19, 1995 || Kitt Peak || Spacewatch ||  || align=right data-sort-value="0.95" | 950 m || 
|-id=166 bgcolor=#d6d6d6
| 572166 ||  || — || December 18, 2007 || Mount Lemmon || Mount Lemmon Survey ||  || align=right | 3.1 km || 
|-id=167 bgcolor=#d6d6d6
| 572167 ||  || — || February 29, 2008 || Mount Lemmon || Mount Lemmon Survey ||  || align=right | 2.9 km || 
|-id=168 bgcolor=#d6d6d6
| 572168 ||  || — || February 28, 2008 || Kitt Peak || Spacewatch ||  || align=right | 3.2 km || 
|-id=169 bgcolor=#E9E9E9
| 572169 ||  || — || February 28, 2008 || Mount Lemmon || Mount Lemmon Survey ||  || align=right data-sort-value="0.91" | 910 m || 
|-id=170 bgcolor=#fefefe
| 572170 ||  || — || December 15, 1999 || Kitt Peak || Spacewatch ||  || align=right data-sort-value="0.58" | 580 m || 
|-id=171 bgcolor=#d6d6d6
| 572171 ||  || — || February 28, 2008 || Mount Lemmon || Mount Lemmon Survey ||  || align=right | 2.4 km || 
|-id=172 bgcolor=#d6d6d6
| 572172 ||  || — || February 27, 2008 || Mount Lemmon || Mount Lemmon Survey ||  || align=right | 2.2 km || 
|-id=173 bgcolor=#E9E9E9
| 572173 ||  || — || September 21, 2001 || Kitt Peak || Spacewatch ||  || align=right | 1.2 km || 
|-id=174 bgcolor=#d6d6d6
| 572174 ||  || — || August 28, 2005 || Kitt Peak || Spacewatch ||  || align=right | 2.5 km || 
|-id=175 bgcolor=#d6d6d6
| 572175 ||  || — || February 28, 2008 || Mount Lemmon || Mount Lemmon Survey ||  || align=right | 2.2 km || 
|-id=176 bgcolor=#d6d6d6
| 572176 ||  || — || July 15, 2004 || Siding Spring || SSS ||  || align=right | 2.8 km || 
|-id=177 bgcolor=#E9E9E9
| 572177 ||  || — || February 29, 2008 || Mount Lemmon || Mount Lemmon Survey ||  || align=right data-sort-value="0.74" | 740 m || 
|-id=178 bgcolor=#d6d6d6
| 572178 ||  || — || September 13, 2005 || Kitt Peak || Spacewatch ||  || align=right | 2.8 km || 
|-id=179 bgcolor=#fefefe
| 572179 ||  || — || February 7, 2008 || Kitt Peak || Spacewatch || MAS || align=right data-sort-value="0.59" | 590 m || 
|-id=180 bgcolor=#d6d6d6
| 572180 ||  || — || February 18, 2008 || Mount Lemmon || Mount Lemmon Survey ||  || align=right | 4.0 km || 
|-id=181 bgcolor=#d6d6d6
| 572181 ||  || — || February 28, 2008 || Mount Lemmon || Mount Lemmon Survey ||  || align=right | 2.4 km || 
|-id=182 bgcolor=#fefefe
| 572182 ||  || — || February 16, 2015 || Haleakala || Pan-STARRS ||  || align=right data-sort-value="0.82" | 820 m || 
|-id=183 bgcolor=#d6d6d6
| 572183 ||  || — || February 26, 2014 || Mount Lemmon || Mount Lemmon Survey ||  || align=right | 3.1 km || 
|-id=184 bgcolor=#d6d6d6
| 572184 ||  || — || August 2, 2016 || Haleakala || Pan-STARRS ||  || align=right | 2.4 km || 
|-id=185 bgcolor=#d6d6d6
| 572185 ||  || — || February 28, 2008 || Mount Lemmon || Mount Lemmon Survey ||  || align=right | 2.5 km || 
|-id=186 bgcolor=#d6d6d6
| 572186 ||  || — || August 29, 2016 || Mount Lemmon || Mount Lemmon Survey ||  || align=right | 2.5 km || 
|-id=187 bgcolor=#d6d6d6
| 572187 ||  || — || February 26, 2008 || Kitt Peak || Spacewatch ||  || align=right | 2.4 km || 
|-id=188 bgcolor=#d6d6d6
| 572188 ||  || — || February 24, 2008 || Kitt Peak || Spacewatch ||  || align=right | 2.4 km || 
|-id=189 bgcolor=#d6d6d6
| 572189 ||  || — || February 28, 2008 || Kitt Peak || Spacewatch ||  || align=right | 2.4 km || 
|-id=190 bgcolor=#d6d6d6
| 572190 ||  || — || February 28, 2008 || Kitt Peak || Spacewatch ||  || align=right | 2.6 km || 
|-id=191 bgcolor=#E9E9E9
| 572191 ||  || — || February 28, 2008 || Mount Lemmon || Mount Lemmon Survey ||  || align=right data-sort-value="0.68" | 680 m || 
|-id=192 bgcolor=#d6d6d6
| 572192 ||  || — || February 25, 2008 || Mount Lemmon || Mount Lemmon Survey ||  || align=right | 2.4 km || 
|-id=193 bgcolor=#d6d6d6
| 572193 ||  || — || February 18, 2008 || Mount Lemmon || Mount Lemmon Survey ||  || align=right | 2.1 km || 
|-id=194 bgcolor=#fefefe
| 572194 ||  || — || March 1, 2008 || Mount Lemmon || Mount Lemmon Survey ||  || align=right data-sort-value="0.95" | 950 m || 
|-id=195 bgcolor=#d6d6d6
| 572195 ||  || — || March 1, 2008 || Mount Lemmon || Mount Lemmon Survey ||  || align=right | 2.2 km || 
|-id=196 bgcolor=#fefefe
| 572196 ||  || — || March 6, 2008 || Mount Lemmon || Mount Lemmon Survey || H || align=right data-sort-value="0.62" | 620 m || 
|-id=197 bgcolor=#d6d6d6
| 572197 ||  || — || March 1, 2008 || Kitt Peak || Spacewatch ||  || align=right | 2.5 km || 
|-id=198 bgcolor=#E9E9E9
| 572198 ||  || — || March 3, 2008 || Mount Lemmon || Mount Lemmon Survey ||  || align=right data-sort-value="0.83" | 830 m || 
|-id=199 bgcolor=#d6d6d6
| 572199 ||  || — || March 4, 2008 || Mount Lemmon || Mount Lemmon Survey ||  || align=right | 2.9 km || 
|-id=200 bgcolor=#E9E9E9
| 572200 ||  || — || March 4, 2008 || Mount Lemmon || Mount Lemmon Survey ||  || align=right data-sort-value="0.77" | 770 m || 
|}

572201–572300 

|-bgcolor=#fefefe
| 572201 ||  || — || March 5, 2008 || Mount Lemmon || Mount Lemmon Survey ||  || align=right data-sort-value="0.78" | 780 m || 
|-id=202 bgcolor=#E9E9E9
| 572202 ||  || — || March 5, 2008 || Mount Lemmon || Mount Lemmon Survey ||  || align=right data-sort-value="0.92" | 920 m || 
|-id=203 bgcolor=#d6d6d6
| 572203 ||  || — || March 5, 2008 || Mount Lemmon || Mount Lemmon Survey ||  || align=right | 2.6 km || 
|-id=204 bgcolor=#E9E9E9
| 572204 ||  || — || February 29, 2008 || Kitt Peak || Spacewatch ||  || align=right data-sort-value="0.60" | 600 m || 
|-id=205 bgcolor=#fefefe
| 572205 ||  || — || March 6, 2008 || Mount Lemmon || Mount Lemmon Survey ||  || align=right data-sort-value="0.87" | 870 m || 
|-id=206 bgcolor=#E9E9E9
| 572206 ||  || — || July 27, 2014 || Haleakala || Pan-STARRS ||  || align=right data-sort-value="0.95" | 950 m || 
|-id=207 bgcolor=#d6d6d6
| 572207 ||  || — || March 7, 2008 || Mount Lemmon || Mount Lemmon Survey ||  || align=right | 3.2 km || 
|-id=208 bgcolor=#d6d6d6
| 572208 ||  || — || July 31, 2005 || Palomar || NEAT ||  || align=right | 2.8 km || 
|-id=209 bgcolor=#d6d6d6
| 572209 ||  || — || March 9, 2008 || Mount Lemmon || Mount Lemmon Survey ||  || align=right | 2.9 km || 
|-id=210 bgcolor=#d6d6d6
| 572210 ||  || — || March 8, 2008 || Catalina || CSS ||  || align=right | 3.7 km || 
|-id=211 bgcolor=#d6d6d6
| 572211 ||  || — || March 9, 2008 || Mount Lemmon || Mount Lemmon Survey ||  || align=right | 2.9 km || 
|-id=212 bgcolor=#C2FFFF
| 572212 ||  || — || January 13, 2004 || Kitt Peak || Spacewatch || L5 || align=right | 12 km || 
|-id=213 bgcolor=#FA8072
| 572213 ||  || — || March 6, 2008 || Mount Lemmon || Mount Lemmon Survey || H || align=right data-sort-value="0.43" | 430 m || 
|-id=214 bgcolor=#d6d6d6
| 572214 ||  || — || August 27, 2005 || Kitt Peak || Spacewatch ||  || align=right | 2.4 km || 
|-id=215 bgcolor=#E9E9E9
| 572215 ||  || — || March 8, 2008 || Mount Lemmon || Mount Lemmon Survey ||  || align=right data-sort-value="0.63" | 630 m || 
|-id=216 bgcolor=#d6d6d6
| 572216 ||  || — || April 29, 2003 || Kitt Peak || Spacewatch ||  || align=right | 4.0 km || 
|-id=217 bgcolor=#d6d6d6
| 572217 Dramba ||  ||  || March 11, 2008 || La Silla || EURONEAR ||  || align=right | 3.0 km || 
|-id=218 bgcolor=#C2FFFF
| 572218 ||  || — || March 13, 2008 || Mount Lemmon || Mount Lemmon Survey || L5 || align=right | 11 km || 
|-id=219 bgcolor=#fefefe
| 572219 ||  || — || January 28, 2000 || Kitt Peak || Spacewatch ||  || align=right data-sort-value="0.79" | 790 m || 
|-id=220 bgcolor=#d6d6d6
| 572220 ||  || — || March 5, 2008 || Mount Lemmon || Mount Lemmon Survey ||  || align=right | 2.9 km || 
|-id=221 bgcolor=#d6d6d6
| 572221 ||  || — || March 6, 2008 || Mount Lemmon || Mount Lemmon Survey ||  || align=right | 4.3 km || 
|-id=222 bgcolor=#E9E9E9
| 572222 ||  || — || March 5, 2008 || Mount Lemmon || Mount Lemmon Survey ||  || align=right data-sort-value="0.67" | 670 m || 
|-id=223 bgcolor=#d6d6d6
| 572223 ||  || — || March 6, 2008 || Mount Lemmon || Mount Lemmon Survey ||  || align=right | 2.5 km || 
|-id=224 bgcolor=#fefefe
| 572224 ||  || — || March 6, 2008 || Mount Lemmon || Mount Lemmon Survey ||  || align=right data-sort-value="0.68" | 680 m || 
|-id=225 bgcolor=#d6d6d6
| 572225 ||  || — || February 8, 2008 || Mount Lemmon || Mount Lemmon Survey ||  || align=right | 2.7 km || 
|-id=226 bgcolor=#d6d6d6
| 572226 ||  || — || March 8, 2008 || Kitt Peak || Spacewatch ||  || align=right | 2.8 km || 
|-id=227 bgcolor=#fefefe
| 572227 ||  || — || March 8, 2008 || Kitt Peak || Spacewatch ||  || align=right data-sort-value="0.62" | 620 m || 
|-id=228 bgcolor=#d6d6d6
| 572228 ||  || — || April 25, 2003 || Kitt Peak || Spacewatch ||  || align=right | 2.7 km || 
|-id=229 bgcolor=#E9E9E9
| 572229 ||  || — || March 8, 2008 || Mount Lemmon || Mount Lemmon Survey ||  || align=right data-sort-value="0.90" | 900 m || 
|-id=230 bgcolor=#E9E9E9
| 572230 ||  || — || March 8, 2008 || Kitt Peak || Spacewatch ||  || align=right data-sort-value="0.77" | 770 m || 
|-id=231 bgcolor=#E9E9E9
| 572231 ||  || — || March 8, 2008 || Kitt Peak || Spacewatch ||  || align=right data-sort-value="0.97" | 970 m || 
|-id=232 bgcolor=#fefefe
| 572232 ||  || — || January 27, 2004 || Kitt Peak || Spacewatch ||  || align=right data-sort-value="0.67" | 670 m || 
|-id=233 bgcolor=#d6d6d6
| 572233 ||  || — || March 10, 2008 || Mount Lemmon || Mount Lemmon Survey ||  || align=right | 2.7 km || 
|-id=234 bgcolor=#d6d6d6
| 572234 ||  || — || March 11, 2008 || Mount Lemmon || Mount Lemmon Survey ||  || align=right | 2.7 km || 
|-id=235 bgcolor=#E9E9E9
| 572235 ||  || — || March 21, 2004 || Kitt Peak || Spacewatch ||  || align=right data-sort-value="0.98" | 980 m || 
|-id=236 bgcolor=#d6d6d6
| 572236 ||  || — || March 11, 2008 || Mount Lemmon || Mount Lemmon Survey ||  || align=right | 2.5 km || 
|-id=237 bgcolor=#E9E9E9
| 572237 ||  || — || March 11, 2008 || Mount Lemmon || Mount Lemmon Survey ||  || align=right data-sort-value="0.99" | 990 m || 
|-id=238 bgcolor=#fefefe
| 572238 ||  || — || February 28, 2008 || Kitt Peak || Spacewatch ||  || align=right data-sort-value="0.57" | 570 m || 
|-id=239 bgcolor=#d6d6d6
| 572239 ||  || — || March 11, 2008 || Mount Lemmon || Mount Lemmon Survey ||  || align=right | 2.5 km || 
|-id=240 bgcolor=#E9E9E9
| 572240 ||  || — || January 25, 2003 || La Silla || A. Boattini, O. R. Hainaut ||  || align=right | 2.1 km || 
|-id=241 bgcolor=#fefefe
| 572241 ||  || — || March 4, 2008 || Kitt Peak || Spacewatch ||  || align=right data-sort-value="0.80" | 800 m || 
|-id=242 bgcolor=#d6d6d6
| 572242 ||  || — || May 3, 2008 || Mount Lemmon || Mount Lemmon Survey ||  || align=right | 2.1 km || 
|-id=243 bgcolor=#d6d6d6
| 572243 ||  || — || March 8, 2008 || Mount Lemmon || Mount Lemmon Survey ||  || align=right | 3.1 km || 
|-id=244 bgcolor=#d6d6d6
| 572244 ||  || — || January 16, 2008 || Mount Lemmon || Mount Lemmon Survey ||  || align=right | 2.4 km || 
|-id=245 bgcolor=#E9E9E9
| 572245 ||  || — || March 28, 2008 || Kitt Peak || Spacewatch ||  || align=right | 1.3 km || 
|-id=246 bgcolor=#d6d6d6
| 572246 ||  || — || June 16, 2015 || Haleakala || Pan-STARRS ||  || align=right | 3.0 km || 
|-id=247 bgcolor=#d6d6d6
| 572247 ||  || — || March 10, 2008 || Kitt Peak || Spacewatch ||  || align=right | 2.4 km || 
|-id=248 bgcolor=#d6d6d6
| 572248 ||  || — || June 12, 2015 || Haleakala || Pan-STARRS ||  || align=right | 2.9 km || 
|-id=249 bgcolor=#d6d6d6
| 572249 ||  || — || October 26, 2011 || Haleakala || Pan-STARRS ||  || align=right | 2.5 km || 
|-id=250 bgcolor=#d6d6d6
| 572250 ||  || — || October 21, 2011 || Kitt Peak || Spacewatch ||  || align=right | 2.2 km || 
|-id=251 bgcolor=#E9E9E9
| 572251 ||  || — || November 27, 2014 || Haleakala || Pan-STARRS ||  || align=right data-sort-value="0.99" | 990 m || 
|-id=252 bgcolor=#d6d6d6
| 572252 ||  || — || March 15, 2008 || Mount Lemmon || Mount Lemmon Survey ||  || align=right | 2.9 km || 
|-id=253 bgcolor=#d6d6d6
| 572253 ||  || — || October 24, 2011 || Haleakala || Pan-STARRS ||  || align=right | 2.2 km || 
|-id=254 bgcolor=#d6d6d6
| 572254 ||  || — || October 10, 2012 || Mount Lemmon || Mount Lemmon Survey ||  || align=right | 3.0 km || 
|-id=255 bgcolor=#d6d6d6
| 572255 ||  || — || February 26, 2014 || Haleakala || Pan-STARRS ||  || align=right | 3.0 km || 
|-id=256 bgcolor=#fefefe
| 572256 ||  || — || March 14, 2015 || Haleakala || Pan-STARRS ||  || align=right data-sort-value="0.68" | 680 m || 
|-id=257 bgcolor=#fefefe
| 572257 ||  || — || January 15, 2015 || Mount Lemmon || Mount Lemmon Survey ||  || align=right data-sort-value="0.92" | 920 m || 
|-id=258 bgcolor=#d6d6d6
| 572258 ||  || — || November 3, 2011 || Catalina || CSS ||  || align=right | 2.2 km || 
|-id=259 bgcolor=#d6d6d6
| 572259 ||  || — || February 28, 2014 || Haleakala || Pan-STARRS ||  || align=right | 2.5 km || 
|-id=260 bgcolor=#d6d6d6
| 572260 ||  || — || September 4, 2016 || Mount Lemmon || Mount Lemmon Survey ||  || align=right | 2.6 km || 
|-id=261 bgcolor=#d6d6d6
| 572261 ||  || — || November 3, 2011 || Kitt Peak || Spacewatch ||  || align=right | 2.5 km || 
|-id=262 bgcolor=#d6d6d6
| 572262 ||  || — || August 10, 2016 || Haleakala || Pan-STARRS ||  || align=right | 2.4 km || 
|-id=263 bgcolor=#d6d6d6
| 572263 ||  || — || February 26, 2008 || Kitt Peak || Spacewatch ||  || align=right | 2.3 km || 
|-id=264 bgcolor=#E9E9E9
| 572264 ||  || — || March 11, 2008 || Kitt Peak || Spacewatch ||  || align=right data-sort-value="0.72" | 720 m || 
|-id=265 bgcolor=#d6d6d6
| 572265 ||  || — || August 22, 2010 || Sternwarte Hagen || M. Klein ||  || align=right | 2.9 km || 
|-id=266 bgcolor=#E9E9E9
| 572266 ||  || — || March 1, 2008 || Kitt Peak || Spacewatch ||  || align=right data-sort-value="0.67" | 670 m || 
|-id=267 bgcolor=#d6d6d6
| 572267 ||  || — || October 23, 2011 || Kitt Peak || Spacewatch ||  || align=right | 3.0 km || 
|-id=268 bgcolor=#E9E9E9
| 572268 ||  || — || January 11, 2016 || Haleakala || Pan-STARRS ||  || align=right | 2.2 km || 
|-id=269 bgcolor=#d6d6d6
| 572269 ||  || — || April 28, 2003 || Kitt Peak || Spacewatch ||  || align=right | 2.6 km || 
|-id=270 bgcolor=#d6d6d6
| 572270 ||  || — || March 12, 2013 || Palomar || PTF ||  || align=right | 2.6 km || 
|-id=271 bgcolor=#fefefe
| 572271 ||  || — || January 28, 2015 || Haleakala || Pan-STARRS ||  || align=right data-sort-value="0.68" | 680 m || 
|-id=272 bgcolor=#d6d6d6
| 572272 ||  || — || June 22, 2015 || Haleakala || Pan-STARRS ||  || align=right | 3.0 km || 
|-id=273 bgcolor=#d6d6d6
| 572273 ||  || — || July 30, 2017 || Haleakala || Pan-STARRS ||  || align=right | 3.5 km || 
|-id=274 bgcolor=#d6d6d6
| 572274 ||  || — || May 25, 2014 || Haleakala || Pan-STARRS ||  || align=right | 2.5 km || 
|-id=275 bgcolor=#d6d6d6
| 572275 ||  || — || December 22, 2012 || Haleakala || Pan-STARRS ||  || align=right | 2.7 km || 
|-id=276 bgcolor=#d6d6d6
| 572276 ||  || — || December 16, 2017 || Mount Lemmon || Mount Lemmon Survey ||  || align=right | 2.3 km || 
|-id=277 bgcolor=#d6d6d6
| 572277 ||  || — || October 24, 2011 || Mount Lemmon || Mount Lemmon Survey ||  || align=right | 2.2 km || 
|-id=278 bgcolor=#C2FFFF
| 572278 ||  || — || March 13, 2008 || Kitt Peak || Spacewatch || L5 || align=right | 7.5 km || 
|-id=279 bgcolor=#d6d6d6
| 572279 ||  || — || March 6, 2008 || Mount Lemmon || Mount Lemmon Survey ||  || align=right | 2.4 km || 
|-id=280 bgcolor=#d6d6d6
| 572280 ||  || — || March 7, 2008 || Mount Lemmon || Mount Lemmon Survey ||  || align=right | 2.7 km || 
|-id=281 bgcolor=#E9E9E9
| 572281 ||  || — || March 6, 2008 || Mount Lemmon || Mount Lemmon Survey ||  || align=right data-sort-value="0.85" | 850 m || 
|-id=282 bgcolor=#C2FFFF
| 572282 ||  || — || March 13, 2008 || Kitt Peak || Spacewatch || L5 || align=right | 6.6 km || 
|-id=283 bgcolor=#d6d6d6
| 572283 ||  || — || March 12, 2008 || Mount Lemmon || Mount Lemmon Survey ||  || align=right | 2.4 km || 
|-id=284 bgcolor=#d6d6d6
| 572284 ||  || — || March 7, 2008 || Kitt Peak || Spacewatch ||  || align=right | 1.9 km || 
|-id=285 bgcolor=#d6d6d6
| 572285 ||  || — || March 11, 2008 || Kitt Peak || Spacewatch ||  || align=right | 2.1 km || 
|-id=286 bgcolor=#d6d6d6
| 572286 ||  || — || March 8, 2008 || Mount Lemmon || Mount Lemmon Survey ||  || align=right | 2.3 km || 
|-id=287 bgcolor=#E9E9E9
| 572287 ||  || — || March 7, 2008 || Mount Lemmon || Mount Lemmon Survey ||  || align=right | 1.8 km || 
|-id=288 bgcolor=#E9E9E9
| 572288 ||  || — || March 4, 2008 || Mount Lemmon || Mount Lemmon Survey ||  || align=right | 1.0 km || 
|-id=289 bgcolor=#fefefe
| 572289 ||  || — || March 6, 2008 || Mount Lemmon || Mount Lemmon Survey ||  || align=right data-sort-value="0.52" | 520 m || 
|-id=290 bgcolor=#d6d6d6
| 572290 ||  || — || March 5, 2008 || Kitt Peak || Spacewatch ||  || align=right | 2.5 km || 
|-id=291 bgcolor=#E9E9E9
| 572291 ||  || — || March 10, 2008 || Mount Lemmon || Mount Lemmon Survey ||  || align=right data-sort-value="0.88" | 880 m || 
|-id=292 bgcolor=#fefefe
| 572292 ||  || — || February 28, 2008 || Mount Lemmon || Mount Lemmon Survey ||  || align=right data-sort-value="0.86" | 860 m || 
|-id=293 bgcolor=#d6d6d6
| 572293 ||  || — || April 10, 2003 || Kitt Peak || Spacewatch ||  || align=right | 3.0 km || 
|-id=294 bgcolor=#fefefe
| 572294 ||  || — || March 28, 2008 || Mount Lemmon || Mount Lemmon Survey ||  || align=right data-sort-value="0.73" | 730 m || 
|-id=295 bgcolor=#fefefe
| 572295 ||  || — || March 28, 2008 || Mount Lemmon || Mount Lemmon Survey ||  || align=right data-sort-value="0.55" | 550 m || 
|-id=296 bgcolor=#d6d6d6
| 572296 ||  || — || March 28, 2008 || Mount Lemmon || Mount Lemmon Survey ||  || align=right | 2.3 km || 
|-id=297 bgcolor=#d6d6d6
| 572297 ||  || — || March 28, 2008 || Mount Lemmon || Mount Lemmon Survey ||  || align=right | 2.9 km || 
|-id=298 bgcolor=#E9E9E9
| 572298 ||  || — || March 28, 2008 || Mount Lemmon || Mount Lemmon Survey ||  || align=right data-sort-value="0.66" | 660 m || 
|-id=299 bgcolor=#E9E9E9
| 572299 ||  || — || March 15, 2008 || Mount Lemmon || Mount Lemmon Survey ||  || align=right data-sort-value="0.60" | 600 m || 
|-id=300 bgcolor=#E9E9E9
| 572300 ||  || — || March 28, 2008 || Kitt Peak || Spacewatch ||  || align=right | 1.5 km || 
|}

572301–572400 

|-bgcolor=#E9E9E9
| 572301 ||  || — || March 12, 2008 || Kitt Peak || Spacewatch ||  || align=right data-sort-value="0.92" | 920 m || 
|-id=302 bgcolor=#d6d6d6
| 572302 ||  || — || March 30, 2008 || Kitt Peak || Spacewatch ||  || align=right | 2.4 km || 
|-id=303 bgcolor=#fefefe
| 572303 ||  || — || March 30, 2008 || Kitt Peak || Spacewatch ||  || align=right data-sort-value="0.78" | 780 m || 
|-id=304 bgcolor=#d6d6d6
| 572304 ||  || — || March 31, 2008 || Mount Lemmon || Mount Lemmon Survey ||  || align=right | 2.2 km || 
|-id=305 bgcolor=#fefefe
| 572305 ||  || — || March 28, 2008 || Kitt Peak || Spacewatch ||  || align=right data-sort-value="0.43" | 430 m || 
|-id=306 bgcolor=#E9E9E9
| 572306 ||  || — || February 28, 2008 || Mount Lemmon || Mount Lemmon Survey ||  || align=right | 1.0 km || 
|-id=307 bgcolor=#d6d6d6
| 572307 ||  || — || October 8, 2005 || Moletai || K. Černis, J. Zdanavičius ||  || align=right | 3.2 km || 
|-id=308 bgcolor=#d6d6d6
| 572308 ||  || — || February 6, 2008 || Catalina || CSS ||  || align=right | 2.3 km || 
|-id=309 bgcolor=#E9E9E9
| 572309 ||  || — || March 29, 2008 || Kitt Peak || Spacewatch ||  || align=right | 1.9 km || 
|-id=310 bgcolor=#E9E9E9
| 572310 ||  || — || March 30, 2008 || Kitt Peak || Spacewatch ||  || align=right data-sort-value="0.92" | 920 m || 
|-id=311 bgcolor=#E9E9E9
| 572311 ||  || — || March 30, 2008 || Kitt Peak || Spacewatch ||  || align=right data-sort-value="0.70" | 700 m || 
|-id=312 bgcolor=#E9E9E9
| 572312 ||  || — || March 10, 2008 || Kitt Peak || Spacewatch ||  || align=right data-sort-value="0.91" | 910 m || 
|-id=313 bgcolor=#E9E9E9
| 572313 ||  || — || March 31, 2008 || Mount Lemmon || Mount Lemmon Survey ||  || align=right data-sort-value="0.73" | 730 m || 
|-id=314 bgcolor=#fefefe
| 572314 ||  || — || March 31, 2008 || Kitt Peak || Spacewatch ||  || align=right data-sort-value="0.65" | 650 m || 
|-id=315 bgcolor=#E9E9E9
| 572315 ||  || — || March 31, 2008 || Mount Lemmon || Mount Lemmon Survey ||  || align=right data-sort-value="0.68" | 680 m || 
|-id=316 bgcolor=#C2FFFF
| 572316 ||  || — || March 31, 2008 || Mount Lemmon || Mount Lemmon Survey || L5 || align=right | 6.5 km || 
|-id=317 bgcolor=#d6d6d6
| 572317 ||  || — || March 27, 2008 || Mount Lemmon || Mount Lemmon Survey || VER || align=right | 2.4 km || 
|-id=318 bgcolor=#d6d6d6
| 572318 ||  || — || February 10, 2008 || Kitt Peak || Spacewatch ||  || align=right | 2.5 km || 
|-id=319 bgcolor=#E9E9E9
| 572319 ||  || — || March 31, 2008 || Kitt Peak || Spacewatch ||  || align=right data-sort-value="0.86" | 860 m || 
|-id=320 bgcolor=#C2FFFF
| 572320 ||  || — || March 27, 2008 || Mount Lemmon || Mount Lemmon Survey || L5 || align=right | 7.3 km || 
|-id=321 bgcolor=#d6d6d6
| 572321 ||  || — || November 27, 2011 || Kitt Peak || Spacewatch ||  || align=right | 3.1 km || 
|-id=322 bgcolor=#d6d6d6
| 572322 ||  || — || March 26, 2008 || Mount Lemmon || Mount Lemmon Survey ||  || align=right | 2.2 km || 
|-id=323 bgcolor=#E9E9E9
| 572323 ||  || — || March 30, 2008 || Kitt Peak || Spacewatch ||  || align=right | 1.3 km || 
|-id=324 bgcolor=#fefefe
| 572324 ||  || — || March 31, 2008 || Mount Lemmon || Mount Lemmon Survey ||  || align=right data-sort-value="0.72" | 720 m || 
|-id=325 bgcolor=#d6d6d6
| 572325 ||  || — || March 27, 2008 || Kitt Peak || Spacewatch ||  || align=right | 2.0 km || 
|-id=326 bgcolor=#C2FFFF
| 572326 ||  || — || March 29, 2008 || Kitt Peak || Spacewatch || L5 || align=right | 8.0 km || 
|-id=327 bgcolor=#C2FFFF
| 572327 ||  || — || March 31, 2008 || Mount Lemmon || Mount Lemmon Survey || L5 || align=right | 8.8 km || 
|-id=328 bgcolor=#d6d6d6
| 572328 ||  || — || March 28, 2008 || Mount Lemmon || Mount Lemmon Survey ||  || align=right | 3.0 km || 
|-id=329 bgcolor=#C2FFFF
| 572329 ||  || — || March 30, 2008 || Kitt Peak || Spacewatch || L5 || align=right | 6.5 km || 
|-id=330 bgcolor=#d6d6d6
| 572330 ||  || — || April 1, 2008 || Kitt Peak || Spacewatch ||  || align=right | 2.3 km || 
|-id=331 bgcolor=#E9E9E9
| 572331 ||  || — || April 3, 2008 || Kitt Peak || Spacewatch ||  || align=right data-sort-value="0.73" | 730 m || 
|-id=332 bgcolor=#E9E9E9
| 572332 ||  || — || March 1, 2008 || Kitt Peak || Spacewatch ||  || align=right data-sort-value="0.86" | 860 m || 
|-id=333 bgcolor=#fefefe
| 572333 ||  || — || November 16, 2006 || Kitt Peak || Spacewatch ||  || align=right data-sort-value="0.82" | 820 m || 
|-id=334 bgcolor=#E9E9E9
| 572334 ||  || — || May 17, 1996 || Kitt Peak || Spacewatch ||  || align=right | 1.0 km || 
|-id=335 bgcolor=#E9E9E9
| 572335 ||  || — || August 30, 2005 || Kitt Peak || Spacewatch ||  || align=right | 1.1 km || 
|-id=336 bgcolor=#d6d6d6
| 572336 ||  || — || April 1, 2008 || Mount Lemmon || Mount Lemmon Survey ||  || align=right | 2.2 km || 
|-id=337 bgcolor=#fefefe
| 572337 ||  || — || April 1, 2008 || Kitt Peak || Spacewatch || H || align=right data-sort-value="0.43" | 430 m || 
|-id=338 bgcolor=#E9E9E9
| 572338 ||  || — || February 12, 2008 || Mount Lemmon || Mount Lemmon Survey ||  || align=right data-sort-value="0.69" | 690 m || 
|-id=339 bgcolor=#d6d6d6
| 572339 ||  || — || March 10, 2008 || Kitt Peak || Spacewatch || 7:4* || align=right | 2.4 km || 
|-id=340 bgcolor=#E9E9E9
| 572340 ||  || — || April 3, 2008 || Kitt Peak || Spacewatch ||  || align=right | 1.0 km || 
|-id=341 bgcolor=#E9E9E9
| 572341 ||  || — || March 18, 2004 || Kitt Peak || Spacewatch ||  || align=right data-sort-value="0.75" | 750 m || 
|-id=342 bgcolor=#E9E9E9
| 572342 ||  || — || February 9, 2008 || Mount Lemmon || Mount Lemmon Survey ||  || align=right data-sort-value="0.70" | 700 m || 
|-id=343 bgcolor=#E9E9E9
| 572343 ||  || — || April 4, 2008 || Kitt Peak || Spacewatch ||  || align=right data-sort-value="0.90" | 900 m || 
|-id=344 bgcolor=#E9E9E9
| 572344 ||  || — || April 4, 2008 || Kitt Peak || Spacewatch ||  || align=right data-sort-value="0.85" | 850 m || 
|-id=345 bgcolor=#E9E9E9
| 572345 ||  || — || April 4, 2008 || Mount Lemmon || Mount Lemmon Survey ||  || align=right | 1.6 km || 
|-id=346 bgcolor=#d6d6d6
| 572346 ||  || — || April 4, 2008 || Kitt Peak || Spacewatch ||  || align=right | 2.7 km || 
|-id=347 bgcolor=#d6d6d6
| 572347 ||  || — || April 4, 2008 || Kitt Peak || Spacewatch ||  || align=right | 2.7 km || 
|-id=348 bgcolor=#d6d6d6
| 572348 ||  || — || March 28, 2008 || Mount Lemmon || Mount Lemmon Survey ||  || align=right | 2.7 km || 
|-id=349 bgcolor=#d6d6d6
| 572349 ||  || — || April 5, 2008 || Mount Lemmon || Mount Lemmon Survey ||  || align=right | 1.9 km || 
|-id=350 bgcolor=#C2FFFF
| 572350 ||  || — || April 5, 2008 || Kitt Peak || Spacewatch || L5 || align=right | 8.0 km || 
|-id=351 bgcolor=#d6d6d6
| 572351 ||  || — || March 28, 2008 || Kitt Peak || Spacewatch ||  || align=right | 2.4 km || 
|-id=352 bgcolor=#d6d6d6
| 572352 ||  || — || April 7, 2008 || Kitt Peak || Spacewatch ||  || align=right | 2.5 km || 
|-id=353 bgcolor=#d6d6d6
| 572353 ||  || — || April 3, 2008 || Kitt Peak || Spacewatch ||  || align=right | 3.0 km || 
|-id=354 bgcolor=#d6d6d6
| 572354 ||  || — || April 3, 2008 || Kitt Peak || Spacewatch ||  || align=right | 3.1 km || 
|-id=355 bgcolor=#C2FFFF
| 572355 ||  || — || January 18, 2005 || Kitt Peak || Spacewatch || L5 || align=right | 8.2 km || 
|-id=356 bgcolor=#d6d6d6
| 572356 ||  || — || April 7, 2008 || Mount Lemmon || Mount Lemmon Survey ||  || align=right | 2.8 km || 
|-id=357 bgcolor=#d6d6d6
| 572357 ||  || — || April 7, 2008 || Kitt Peak || Spacewatch ||  || align=right | 2.6 km || 
|-id=358 bgcolor=#d6d6d6
| 572358 ||  || — || March 8, 2008 || Mount Lemmon || Mount Lemmon Survey ||  || align=right | 3.4 km || 
|-id=359 bgcolor=#E9E9E9
| 572359 ||  || — || March 4, 2008 || Mount Lemmon || Mount Lemmon Survey ||  || align=right data-sort-value="0.97" | 970 m || 
|-id=360 bgcolor=#E9E9E9
| 572360 ||  || — || March 5, 2008 || Kitt Peak || Spacewatch ||  || align=right data-sort-value="0.75" | 750 m || 
|-id=361 bgcolor=#d6d6d6
| 572361 ||  || — || October 1, 2005 || Mount Lemmon || Mount Lemmon Survey ||  || align=right | 2.8 km || 
|-id=362 bgcolor=#E9E9E9
| 572362 ||  || — || April 9, 2008 || Kitt Peak || Spacewatch ||  || align=right data-sort-value="0.86" | 860 m || 
|-id=363 bgcolor=#E9E9E9
| 572363 ||  || — || April 11, 2008 || Kitt Peak || Spacewatch ||  || align=right data-sort-value="0.92" | 920 m || 
|-id=364 bgcolor=#fefefe
| 572364 ||  || — || January 30, 2004 || Kitt Peak || Spacewatch ||  || align=right data-sort-value="0.90" | 900 m || 
|-id=365 bgcolor=#d6d6d6
| 572365 ||  || — || April 11, 2008 || Catalina || CSS ||  || align=right | 2.7 km || 
|-id=366 bgcolor=#E9E9E9
| 572366 ||  || — || September 13, 2005 || Catalina || CSS ||  || align=right | 1.7 km || 
|-id=367 bgcolor=#d6d6d6
| 572367 ||  || — || April 10, 2008 || Catalina || CSS || Tj (2.96) || align=right | 1.9 km || 
|-id=368 bgcolor=#C2FFFF
| 572368 ||  || — || April 14, 2008 || Mount Lemmon || Mount Lemmon Survey || L5 || align=right | 9.0 km || 
|-id=369 bgcolor=#E9E9E9
| 572369 ||  || — || March 28, 2012 || Mount Lemmon || Mount Lemmon Survey ||  || align=right data-sort-value="0.79" | 790 m || 
|-id=370 bgcolor=#fefefe
| 572370 ||  || — || April 6, 2008 || Kitt Peak || Spacewatch ||  || align=right data-sort-value="0.68" | 680 m || 
|-id=371 bgcolor=#d6d6d6
| 572371 ||  || — || April 1, 2008 || Kitt Peak || Spacewatch ||  || align=right | 2.0 km || 
|-id=372 bgcolor=#E9E9E9
| 572372 ||  || — || June 11, 2004 || Kitt Peak || Spacewatch ||  || align=right | 1.2 km || 
|-id=373 bgcolor=#fefefe
| 572373 ||  || — || April 15, 2008 || Kitt Peak || Spacewatch ||  || align=right data-sort-value="0.64" | 640 m || 
|-id=374 bgcolor=#C2FFFF
| 572374 ||  || — || April 1, 2008 || Mount Lemmon || Mount Lemmon Survey || L5 || align=right | 10 km || 
|-id=375 bgcolor=#d6d6d6
| 572375 ||  || — || October 31, 2011 || Mount Lemmon || Mount Lemmon Survey ||  || align=right | 2.6 km || 
|-id=376 bgcolor=#d6d6d6
| 572376 ||  || — || April 4, 2008 || Mount Lemmon || Mount Lemmon Survey ||  || align=right | 2.4 km || 
|-id=377 bgcolor=#d6d6d6
| 572377 ||  || — || April 3, 2008 || Kitt Peak || Spacewatch ||  || align=right | 2.6 km || 
|-id=378 bgcolor=#d6d6d6
| 572378 ||  || — || September 3, 2010 || Mount Lemmon || Mount Lemmon Survey ||  || align=right | 2.7 km || 
|-id=379 bgcolor=#d6d6d6
| 572379 ||  || — || September 24, 2011 || Mount Lemmon || Mount Lemmon Survey ||  || align=right | 2.3 km || 
|-id=380 bgcolor=#E9E9E9
| 572380 ||  || — || July 29, 2009 || Kitt Peak || Spacewatch ||  || align=right | 1.3 km || 
|-id=381 bgcolor=#d6d6d6
| 572381 ||  || — || February 3, 2013 || Haleakala || Pan-STARRS ||  || align=right | 2.7 km || 
|-id=382 bgcolor=#C2FFFF
| 572382 ||  || — || October 13, 2013 || Kitt Peak || Spacewatch || L5 || align=right | 7.8 km || 
|-id=383 bgcolor=#C2FFFF
| 572383 ||  || — || November 1, 2013 || Mount Lemmon || Mount Lemmon Survey || L5 || align=right | 8.6 km || 
|-id=384 bgcolor=#fefefe
| 572384 ||  || — || February 16, 2015 || Haleakala || Pan-STARRS ||  || align=right data-sort-value="0.63" | 630 m || 
|-id=385 bgcolor=#d6d6d6
| 572385 ||  || — || April 24, 2014 || Mount Lemmon || Mount Lemmon Survey ||  || align=right | 2.5 km || 
|-id=386 bgcolor=#fefefe
| 572386 ||  || — || January 31, 2016 || Haleakala || Pan-STARRS || H || align=right data-sort-value="0.62" | 620 m || 
|-id=387 bgcolor=#C2FFFF
| 572387 ||  || — || April 15, 2008 || Mount Lemmon || Mount Lemmon Survey || L5 || align=right | 6.4 km || 
|-id=388 bgcolor=#fefefe
| 572388 ||  || — || February 18, 2015 || Haleakala || Pan-STARRS ||  || align=right data-sort-value="0.78" | 780 m || 
|-id=389 bgcolor=#d6d6d6
| 572389 ||  || — || April 9, 2008 || Mount Lemmon || Mount Lemmon Survey ||  || align=right | 2.1 km || 
|-id=390 bgcolor=#d6d6d6
| 572390 ||  || — || September 26, 2011 || Haleakala || Pan-STARRS ||  || align=right | 2.2 km || 
|-id=391 bgcolor=#fefefe
| 572391 ||  || — || August 3, 2016 || Haleakala || Pan-STARRS ||  || align=right data-sort-value="0.68" | 680 m || 
|-id=392 bgcolor=#d6d6d6
| 572392 ||  || — || March 6, 2013 || Haleakala || Pan-STARRS ||  || align=right | 2.0 km || 
|-id=393 bgcolor=#d6d6d6
| 572393 ||  || — || April 1, 2008 || Mount Lemmon || Mount Lemmon Survey ||  || align=right | 2.5 km || 
|-id=394 bgcolor=#d6d6d6
| 572394 ||  || — || December 27, 2011 || Mount Lemmon || Mount Lemmon Survey ||  || align=right | 2.5 km || 
|-id=395 bgcolor=#E9E9E9
| 572395 ||  || — || November 29, 2014 || Mount Lemmon || Mount Lemmon Survey ||  || align=right data-sort-value="0.72" | 720 m || 
|-id=396 bgcolor=#E9E9E9
| 572396 ||  || — || July 24, 2017 || Haleakala || Pan-STARRS ||  || align=right data-sort-value="0.88" | 880 m || 
|-id=397 bgcolor=#d6d6d6
| 572397 ||  || — || September 12, 2015 || XuYi || PMO NEO ||  || align=right | 2.4 km || 
|-id=398 bgcolor=#E9E9E9
| 572398 ||  || — || July 13, 2013 || Haleakala || Pan-STARRS ||  || align=right data-sort-value="0.70" | 700 m || 
|-id=399 bgcolor=#C2FFFF
| 572399 ||  || — || September 26, 2012 || Mount Lemmon || Mount Lemmon Survey || L5 || align=right | 10 km || 
|-id=400 bgcolor=#d6d6d6
| 572400 ||  || — || April 13, 2008 || Kitt Peak || Spacewatch ||  || align=right | 2.5 km || 
|}

572401–572500 

|-bgcolor=#C2FFFF
| 572401 ||  || — || October 4, 2013 || Kitt Peak || Spacewatch || L5 || align=right | 8.1 km || 
|-id=402 bgcolor=#C2FFFF
| 572402 ||  || — || April 6, 2008 || Kitt Peak || Spacewatch || L5 || align=right | 6.5 km || 
|-id=403 bgcolor=#C2FFFF
| 572403 ||  || — || April 4, 2008 || Kitt Peak || Spacewatch || L5 || align=right | 8.0 km || 
|-id=404 bgcolor=#d6d6d6
| 572404 ||  || — || April 9, 2008 || Kitt Peak || Spacewatch ||  || align=right | 1.9 km || 
|-id=405 bgcolor=#d6d6d6
| 572405 ||  || — || October 23, 2011 || Kitt Peak || Spacewatch ||  || align=right | 2.2 km || 
|-id=406 bgcolor=#d6d6d6
| 572406 ||  || — || April 6, 2008 || Mount Lemmon || Mount Lemmon Survey ||  || align=right | 2.6 km || 
|-id=407 bgcolor=#E9E9E9
| 572407 ||  || — || April 1, 2008 || Kitt Peak || Spacewatch ||  || align=right | 1.1 km || 
|-id=408 bgcolor=#C2FFFF
| 572408 ||  || — || April 5, 2008 || Mount Lemmon || Mount Lemmon Survey || L5 || align=right | 7.1 km || 
|-id=409 bgcolor=#C2FFFF
| 572409 ||  || — || April 3, 2008 || Kitt Peak || Spacewatch || L5 || align=right | 7.0 km || 
|-id=410 bgcolor=#FA8072
| 572410 ||  || — || April 29, 2008 || Kitt Peak || Spacewatch ||  || align=right data-sort-value="0.74" | 740 m || 
|-id=411 bgcolor=#d6d6d6
| 572411 ||  || — || April 24, 2008 || Kitt Peak || Spacewatch ||  || align=right | 2.7 km || 
|-id=412 bgcolor=#E9E9E9
| 572412 ||  || — || August 29, 2005 || Kitt Peak || Spacewatch ||  || align=right | 1.3 km || 
|-id=413 bgcolor=#d6d6d6
| 572413 ||  || — || April 25, 2008 || Kitt Peak || Spacewatch ||  || align=right | 2.4 km || 
|-id=414 bgcolor=#fefefe
| 572414 ||  || — || March 13, 2008 || Kitt Peak || Spacewatch || NYS || align=right data-sort-value="0.58" | 580 m || 
|-id=415 bgcolor=#E9E9E9
| 572415 ||  || — || April 27, 2008 || Kitt Peak || Spacewatch ||  || align=right data-sort-value="0.83" | 830 m || 
|-id=416 bgcolor=#fefefe
| 572416 ||  || — || April 25, 2008 || Mount Lemmon || Mount Lemmon Survey || H || align=right data-sort-value="0.65" | 650 m || 
|-id=417 bgcolor=#E9E9E9
| 572417 ||  || — || April 26, 2008 || Mount Lemmon || Mount Lemmon Survey ||  || align=right data-sort-value="0.89" | 890 m || 
|-id=418 bgcolor=#fefefe
| 572418 ||  || — || April 28, 2008 || Kitt Peak || Spacewatch ||  || align=right data-sort-value="0.52" | 520 m || 
|-id=419 bgcolor=#E9E9E9
| 572419 ||  || — || April 11, 2008 || Mount Lemmon || Mount Lemmon Survey ||  || align=right data-sort-value="0.88" | 880 m || 
|-id=420 bgcolor=#E9E9E9
| 572420 ||  || — || April 29, 2008 || Kitt Peak || Spacewatch ||  || align=right | 1.3 km || 
|-id=421 bgcolor=#E9E9E9
| 572421 ||  || — || April 29, 2008 || Kitt Peak || Spacewatch || KON || align=right | 1.9 km || 
|-id=422 bgcolor=#d6d6d6
| 572422 ||  || — || November 3, 2004 || Kitt Peak || Spacewatch ||  || align=right | 3.3 km || 
|-id=423 bgcolor=#d6d6d6
| 572423 ||  || — || April 5, 2008 || Kitt Peak || Spacewatch ||  || align=right | 2.0 km || 
|-id=424 bgcolor=#E9E9E9
| 572424 ||  || — || April 29, 2008 || Mount Lemmon || Mount Lemmon Survey ||  || align=right data-sort-value="0.81" | 810 m || 
|-id=425 bgcolor=#E9E9E9
| 572425 ||  || — || April 29, 2008 || Mount Lemmon || Mount Lemmon Survey ||  || align=right data-sort-value="0.77" | 770 m || 
|-id=426 bgcolor=#d6d6d6
| 572426 ||  || — || April 29, 2008 || Mount Lemmon || Mount Lemmon Survey ||  || align=right | 2.1 km || 
|-id=427 bgcolor=#E9E9E9
| 572427 ||  || — || April 15, 2012 || Haleakala || Pan-STARRS ||  || align=right data-sort-value="0.80" | 800 m || 
|-id=428 bgcolor=#C2FFFF
| 572428 ||  || — || April 30, 2008 || Mount Lemmon || Mount Lemmon Survey || L5 || align=right | 10 km || 
|-id=429 bgcolor=#fefefe
| 572429 ||  || — || April 24, 2008 || Kitt Peak || Spacewatch ||  || align=right data-sort-value="0.75" | 750 m || 
|-id=430 bgcolor=#E9E9E9
| 572430 ||  || — || April 4, 2016 || Haleakala || Pan-STARRS ||  || align=right data-sort-value="0.85" | 850 m || 
|-id=431 bgcolor=#E9E9E9
| 572431 ||  || — || May 3, 2008 || Mount Lemmon || Mount Lemmon Survey ||  || align=right data-sort-value="0.82" | 820 m || 
|-id=432 bgcolor=#E9E9E9
| 572432 ||  || — || October 22, 2006 || Kitt Peak || Spacewatch ||  || align=right data-sort-value="0.93" | 930 m || 
|-id=433 bgcolor=#d6d6d6
| 572433 ||  || — || May 3, 2008 || Kitt Peak || Spacewatch ||  || align=right | 2.7 km || 
|-id=434 bgcolor=#E9E9E9
| 572434 ||  || — || May 4, 2008 || Andrushivka || Y. Ivaščenko ||  || align=right | 1.1 km || 
|-id=435 bgcolor=#d6d6d6
| 572435 ||  || — || November 27, 2006 || Kitt Peak || Spacewatch ||  || align=right | 2.6 km || 
|-id=436 bgcolor=#d6d6d6
| 572436 ||  || — || February 10, 2007 || Catalina || CSS ||  || align=right | 3.6 km || 
|-id=437 bgcolor=#fefefe
| 572437 ||  || — || May 11, 2008 || Kitt Peak || Spacewatch ||  || align=right data-sort-value="0.62" | 620 m || 
|-id=438 bgcolor=#E9E9E9
| 572438 ||  || — || May 7, 2008 || Kitt Peak || Spacewatch ||  || align=right | 2.1 km || 
|-id=439 bgcolor=#C2FFFF
| 572439 ||  || — || May 4, 2008 || Kitt Peak || Spacewatch || L5 || align=right | 11 km || 
|-id=440 bgcolor=#E9E9E9
| 572440 ||  || — || May 13, 2008 || Mount Lemmon || Mount Lemmon Survey || EUN || align=right data-sort-value="0.79" | 790 m || 
|-id=441 bgcolor=#E9E9E9
| 572441 ||  || — || February 27, 2012 || Haleakala || Pan-STARRS ||  || align=right data-sort-value="0.82" | 820 m || 
|-id=442 bgcolor=#E9E9E9
| 572442 ||  || — || May 7, 2008 || Mount Lemmon || Mount Lemmon Survey ||  || align=right data-sort-value="0.84" | 840 m || 
|-id=443 bgcolor=#d6d6d6
| 572443 ||  || — || September 17, 2010 || Mount Lemmon || Mount Lemmon Survey ||  || align=right | 2.6 km || 
|-id=444 bgcolor=#E9E9E9
| 572444 ||  || — || May 5, 2008 || Mount Lemmon || Mount Lemmon Survey ||  || align=right data-sort-value="0.77" | 770 m || 
|-id=445 bgcolor=#E9E9E9
| 572445 ||  || — || May 15, 2008 || Mount Lemmon || Mount Lemmon Survey ||  || align=right | 1.1 km || 
|-id=446 bgcolor=#fefefe
| 572446 ||  || — || May 3, 2008 || Mount Lemmon || Mount Lemmon Survey ||  || align=right data-sort-value="0.42" | 420 m || 
|-id=447 bgcolor=#d6d6d6
| 572447 ||  || — || May 3, 2008 || Mount Lemmon || Mount Lemmon Survey ||  || align=right | 3.4 km || 
|-id=448 bgcolor=#d6d6d6
| 572448 ||  || — || May 5, 2008 || Mount Lemmon || Mount Lemmon Survey ||  || align=right | 2.7 km || 
|-id=449 bgcolor=#d6d6d6
| 572449 ||  || — || January 20, 2018 || Haleakala || Pan-STARRS ||  || align=right | 2.0 km || 
|-id=450 bgcolor=#d6d6d6
| 572450 ||  || — || May 3, 2008 || Mount Lemmon || Mount Lemmon Survey ||  || align=right | 2.3 km || 
|-id=451 bgcolor=#d6d6d6
| 572451 ||  || — || May 3, 2008 || Kitt Peak || Spacewatch ||  || align=right | 2.2 km || 
|-id=452 bgcolor=#d6d6d6
| 572452 ||  || — || May 15, 2008 || Mount Lemmon || Mount Lemmon Survey ||  || align=right | 2.4 km || 
|-id=453 bgcolor=#fefefe
| 572453 ||  || — || July 11, 2016 || Haleakala || Pan-STARRS ||  || align=right data-sort-value="0.68" | 680 m || 
|-id=454 bgcolor=#d6d6d6
| 572454 ||  || — || April 29, 2008 || Kitt Peak || Spacewatch ||  || align=right | 2.1 km || 
|-id=455 bgcolor=#C2FFFF
| 572455 ||  || — || October 3, 2013 || Kitt Peak || Spacewatch || L5 || align=right | 8.0 km || 
|-id=456 bgcolor=#d6d6d6
| 572456 ||  || — || March 15, 2013 || Mount Lemmon || Mount Lemmon Survey ||  || align=right | 2.0 km || 
|-id=457 bgcolor=#d6d6d6
| 572457 ||  || — || May 3, 2008 || Kitt Peak || Spacewatch ||  || align=right | 2.4 km || 
|-id=458 bgcolor=#d6d6d6
| 572458 ||  || — || April 7, 2013 || Mount Lemmon || Mount Lemmon Survey ||  || align=right | 1.8 km || 
|-id=459 bgcolor=#E9E9E9
| 572459 ||  || — || May 3, 2008 || Mount Lemmon || Mount Lemmon Survey ||  || align=right data-sort-value="0.79" | 790 m || 
|-id=460 bgcolor=#d6d6d6
| 572460 ||  || — || May 11, 2008 || Mount Lemmon || Mount Lemmon Survey ||  || align=right | 2.2 km || 
|-id=461 bgcolor=#E9E9E9
| 572461 ||  || — || May 8, 2008 || Kitt Peak || Spacewatch ||  || align=right data-sort-value="0.81" | 810 m || 
|-id=462 bgcolor=#fefefe
| 572462 ||  || — || May 5, 2008 || Mount Lemmon || Mount Lemmon Survey ||  || align=right data-sort-value="0.49" | 490 m || 
|-id=463 bgcolor=#E9E9E9
| 572463 ||  || — || May 7, 2008 || Kitt Peak || Spacewatch ||  || align=right | 1.4 km || 
|-id=464 bgcolor=#fefefe
| 572464 ||  || — || May 5, 2008 || Kitt Peak || Spacewatch ||  || align=right data-sort-value="0.48" | 480 m || 
|-id=465 bgcolor=#E9E9E9
| 572465 ||  || — || May 27, 2008 || Kitt Peak || Spacewatch ||  || align=right data-sort-value="0.72" | 720 m || 
|-id=466 bgcolor=#d6d6d6
| 572466 ||  || — || May 27, 2008 || Kitt Peak || Spacewatch ||  || align=right | 2.3 km || 
|-id=467 bgcolor=#E9E9E9
| 572467 ||  || — || April 28, 2008 || Kitt Peak || Spacewatch ||  || align=right | 1.0 km || 
|-id=468 bgcolor=#d6d6d6
| 572468 ||  || — || April 14, 2008 || Mount Lemmon || Mount Lemmon Survey ||  || align=right | 2.4 km || 
|-id=469 bgcolor=#d6d6d6
| 572469 ||  || — || April 15, 2008 || Mount Lemmon || Mount Lemmon Survey ||  || align=right | 2.3 km || 
|-id=470 bgcolor=#E9E9E9
| 572470 ||  || — || May 28, 2008 || Kitt Peak || Spacewatch ||  || align=right data-sort-value="0.79" | 790 m || 
|-id=471 bgcolor=#d6d6d6
| 572471 ||  || — || May 28, 2008 || Kitt Peak || Spacewatch ||  || align=right | 2.3 km || 
|-id=472 bgcolor=#C2FFFF
| 572472 ||  || — || May 28, 2008 || Kitt Peak || Spacewatch || L5 || align=right | 8.8 km || 
|-id=473 bgcolor=#E9E9E9
| 572473 ||  || — || May 15, 2008 || Mount Lemmon || Mount Lemmon Survey ||  || align=right data-sort-value="0.98" | 980 m || 
|-id=474 bgcolor=#C2FFFF
| 572474 ||  || — || April 14, 2008 || Mount Lemmon || Mount Lemmon Survey || L5 || align=right | 6.5 km || 
|-id=475 bgcolor=#E9E9E9
| 572475 ||  || — || May 30, 2008 || Kitt Peak || Spacewatch ||  || align=right data-sort-value="0.79" | 790 m || 
|-id=476 bgcolor=#E9E9E9
| 572476 ||  || — || May 3, 2008 || Mount Lemmon || Mount Lemmon Survey ||  || align=right data-sort-value="0.98" | 980 m || 
|-id=477 bgcolor=#E9E9E9
| 572477 ||  || — || November 25, 2005 || Kitt Peak || Spacewatch ||  || align=right | 2.1 km || 
|-id=478 bgcolor=#d6d6d6
| 572478 ||  || — || January 27, 2007 || Kitt Peak || Spacewatch ||  || align=right | 3.0 km || 
|-id=479 bgcolor=#E9E9E9
| 572479 ||  || — || May 14, 2008 || Kitt Peak || Spacewatch ||  || align=right | 1.0 km || 
|-id=480 bgcolor=#fefefe
| 572480 ||  || — || February 25, 2011 || Mount Lemmon || Mount Lemmon Survey ||  || align=right data-sort-value="0.78" | 780 m || 
|-id=481 bgcolor=#d6d6d6
| 572481 ||  || — || March 4, 2013 || Haleakala || Pan-STARRS ||  || align=right | 2.7 km || 
|-id=482 bgcolor=#d6d6d6
| 572482 ||  || — || March 5, 2013 || Mount Lemmon || Mount Lemmon Survey ||  || align=right | 2.9 km || 
|-id=483 bgcolor=#d6d6d6
| 572483 ||  || — || January 14, 2011 || Mount Lemmon || Mount Lemmon Survey ||  || align=right | 2.4 km || 
|-id=484 bgcolor=#d6d6d6
| 572484 ||  || — || May 27, 2008 || Kitt Peak || Spacewatch ||  || align=right | 2.4 km || 
|-id=485 bgcolor=#d6d6d6
| 572485 ||  || — || May 31, 2014 || Haleakala || Pan-STARRS ||  || align=right | 2.3 km || 
|-id=486 bgcolor=#d6d6d6
| 572486 ||  || — || March 6, 2013 || Haleakala || Pan-STARRS ||  || align=right | 2.5 km || 
|-id=487 bgcolor=#E9E9E9
| 572487 ||  || — || May 1, 2016 || Haleakala || Pan-STARRS ||  || align=right data-sort-value="0.98" | 980 m || 
|-id=488 bgcolor=#fefefe
| 572488 ||  || — || August 30, 2016 || Haleakala || Pan-STARRS ||  || align=right data-sort-value="0.68" | 680 m || 
|-id=489 bgcolor=#d6d6d6
| 572489 ||  || — || March 19, 2013 || Haleakala || Pan-STARRS ||  || align=right | 2.3 km || 
|-id=490 bgcolor=#C2FFFF
| 572490 ||  || — || May 27, 2008 || Kitt Peak || Spacewatch || L5 || align=right | 7.3 km || 
|-id=491 bgcolor=#d6d6d6
| 572491 ||  || — || February 12, 2018 || Haleakala || Pan-STARRS ||  || align=right | 2.0 km || 
|-id=492 bgcolor=#d6d6d6
| 572492 ||  || — || April 30, 2014 || Haleakala || Pan-STARRS || 7:4 || align=right | 2.7 km || 
|-id=493 bgcolor=#E9E9E9
| 572493 ||  || — || May 13, 2008 || Mount Lemmon || Mount Lemmon Survey ||  || align=right data-sort-value="0.73" | 730 m || 
|-id=494 bgcolor=#E9E9E9
| 572494 ||  || — || April 16, 2008 || Mount Lemmon || Mount Lemmon Survey ||  || align=right | 1.2 km || 
|-id=495 bgcolor=#E9E9E9
| 572495 ||  || — || September 23, 2000 || Socorro || LINEAR ||  || align=right | 1.1 km || 
|-id=496 bgcolor=#d6d6d6
| 572496 ||  || — || June 8, 2008 || Kitt Peak || Spacewatch ||  || align=right | 2.4 km || 
|-id=497 bgcolor=#E9E9E9
| 572497 ||  || — || May 28, 2008 || Kitt Peak || Spacewatch ||  || align=right | 1.3 km || 
|-id=498 bgcolor=#E9E9E9
| 572498 ||  || — || June 2, 2008 || Mount Lemmon || Mount Lemmon Survey ||  || align=right | 2.5 km || 
|-id=499 bgcolor=#E9E9E9
| 572499 ||  || — || January 25, 2011 || Mount Lemmon || Mount Lemmon Survey ||  || align=right data-sort-value="0.85" | 850 m || 
|-id=500 bgcolor=#E9E9E9
| 572500 ||  || — || April 24, 2012 || Kitt Peak || Spacewatch ||  || align=right data-sort-value="0.87" | 870 m || 
|}

572501–572600 

|-bgcolor=#d6d6d6
| 572501 ||  || — || September 25, 2016 || Haleakala || Pan-STARRS ||  || align=right | 2.5 km || 
|-id=502 bgcolor=#d6d6d6
| 572502 ||  || — || November 16, 2010 || Charleston || R. Holmes ||  || align=right | 2.7 km || 
|-id=503 bgcolor=#d6d6d6
| 572503 ||  || — || May 7, 2014 || Haleakala || Pan-STARRS ||  || align=right | 2.4 km || 
|-id=504 bgcolor=#E9E9E9
| 572504 ||  || — || July 3, 2008 || Siding Spring || SSS ||  || align=right | 1.5 km || 
|-id=505 bgcolor=#E9E9E9
| 572505 ||  || — || May 28, 2008 || Mount Lemmon || Mount Lemmon Survey ||  || align=right | 1.5 km || 
|-id=506 bgcolor=#E9E9E9
| 572506 ||  || — || July 30, 2008 || La Sagra || OAM Obs. ||  || align=right | 1.7 km || 
|-id=507 bgcolor=#E9E9E9
| 572507 ||  || — || July 29, 2008 || Mount Lemmon || Mount Lemmon Survey ||  || align=right | 1.9 km || 
|-id=508 bgcolor=#E9E9E9
| 572508 ||  || — || February 18, 2015 || Haleakala || Pan-STARRS ||  || align=right | 1.8 km || 
|-id=509 bgcolor=#E9E9E9
| 572509 ||  || — || July 30, 2008 || Mount Lemmon || Mount Lemmon Survey ||  || align=right | 1.7 km || 
|-id=510 bgcolor=#fefefe
| 572510 ||  || — || July 29, 2008 || Kitt Peak || Spacewatch ||  || align=right data-sort-value="0.82" | 820 m || 
|-id=511 bgcolor=#E9E9E9
| 572511 ||  || — || November 6, 2013 || Haleakala || Pan-STARRS ||  || align=right | 1.4 km || 
|-id=512 bgcolor=#E9E9E9
| 572512 ||  || — || February 10, 2011 || Mount Lemmon || Mount Lemmon Survey ||  || align=right | 1.5 km || 
|-id=513 bgcolor=#E9E9E9
| 572513 ||  || — || February 3, 2016 || Haleakala || Pan-STARRS ||  || align=right | 1.5 km || 
|-id=514 bgcolor=#fefefe
| 572514 ||  || — || July 29, 2008 || Kitt Peak || Spacewatch || H || align=right data-sort-value="0.68" | 680 m || 
|-id=515 bgcolor=#E9E9E9
| 572515 ||  || — || August 9, 2008 || La Sagra || OAM Obs. ||  || align=right | 1.6 km || 
|-id=516 bgcolor=#E9E9E9
| 572516 ||  || — || August 5, 2008 || Siding Spring || SSS ||  || align=right | 1.6 km || 
|-id=517 bgcolor=#fefefe
| 572517 ||  || — || August 4, 2008 || La Sagra || OAM Obs. ||  || align=right data-sort-value="0.63" | 630 m || 
|-id=518 bgcolor=#E9E9E9
| 572518 ||  || — || July 28, 2008 || Mount Lemmon || Mount Lemmon Survey ||  || align=right | 1.7 km || 
|-id=519 bgcolor=#E9E9E9
| 572519 ||  || — || August 24, 2008 || La Sagra || OAM Obs. ||  || align=right | 1.8 km || 
|-id=520 bgcolor=#FA8072
| 572520 ||  || — || August 24, 2008 || Observatoire des T || H. Jacquinot ||  || align=right data-sort-value="0.80" | 800 m || 
|-id=521 bgcolor=#fefefe
| 572521 ||  || — || August 20, 2008 || Kitt Peak || Spacewatch ||  || align=right data-sort-value="0.97" | 970 m || 
|-id=522 bgcolor=#E9E9E9
| 572522 ||  || — || October 7, 2004 || Kitt Peak || Spacewatch ||  || align=right | 1.4 km || 
|-id=523 bgcolor=#d6d6d6
| 572523 ||  || — || August 20, 2008 || Kitt Peak || Spacewatch ||  || align=right | 2.9 km || 
|-id=524 bgcolor=#E9E9E9
| 572524 ||  || — || August 29, 2008 || Dauban || F. Kugel ||  || align=right | 1.3 km || 
|-id=525 bgcolor=#E9E9E9
| 572525 ||  || — || August 23, 2008 || Goodricke-Pigott || R. A. Tucker ||  || align=right | 2.1 km || 
|-id=526 bgcolor=#E9E9E9
| 572526 ||  || — || August 30, 2008 || Prairie Grass || J. Mahony ||  || align=right | 2.4 km || 
|-id=527 bgcolor=#E9E9E9
| 572527 ||  || — || August 26, 2008 || Socorro || LINEAR ||  || align=right | 1.4 km || 
|-id=528 bgcolor=#E9E9E9
| 572528 ||  || — || January 22, 2006 || Mount Lemmon || Mount Lemmon Survey ||  || align=right | 1.5 km || 
|-id=529 bgcolor=#E9E9E9
| 572529 ||  || — || August 30, 2008 || Altschwendt || W. Ries ||  || align=right | 2.2 km || 
|-id=530 bgcolor=#E9E9E9
| 572530 ||  || — || August 30, 2008 || Socorro || LINEAR ||  || align=right | 1.5 km || 
|-id=531 bgcolor=#FA8072
| 572531 ||  || — || August 31, 2008 || Moletai || K. Černis, J. Zdanavičius ||  || align=right data-sort-value="0.76" | 760 m || 
|-id=532 bgcolor=#E9E9E9
| 572532 ||  || — || September 4, 2008 || Goodricke-Pigott || R. A. Tucker ||  || align=right | 1.5 km || 
|-id=533 bgcolor=#E9E9E9
| 572533 ||  || — || August 24, 2008 || Kitt Peak || Spacewatch ||  || align=right data-sort-value="0.99" | 990 m || 
|-id=534 bgcolor=#FA8072
| 572534 ||  || — || August 24, 2008 || Crni Vrh || J. Skvarč ||  || align=right | 1.0 km || 
|-id=535 bgcolor=#fefefe
| 572535 ||  || — || January 28, 2007 || Kitt Peak || Spacewatch || H || align=right data-sort-value="0.60" | 600 m || 
|-id=536 bgcolor=#fefefe
| 572536 ||  || — || April 24, 2014 || Mount Lemmon || Mount Lemmon Survey ||  || align=right data-sort-value="0.62" | 620 m || 
|-id=537 bgcolor=#E9E9E9
| 572537 ||  || — || October 15, 2004 || Mount Lemmon || Mount Lemmon Survey ||  || align=right | 2.3 km || 
|-id=538 bgcolor=#fefefe
| 572538 ||  || — || September 1, 2008 || La Sagra || OAM Obs. || H || align=right data-sort-value="0.64" | 640 m || 
|-id=539 bgcolor=#E9E9E9
| 572539 ||  || — || September 2, 2008 || Kitt Peak || Spacewatch ||  || align=right | 1.4 km || 
|-id=540 bgcolor=#fefefe
| 572540 ||  || — || September 3, 2008 || Kitt Peak || Spacewatch ||  || align=right data-sort-value="0.53" | 530 m || 
|-id=541 bgcolor=#fefefe
| 572541 ||  || — || August 23, 2008 || Goodricke-Pigott || R. A. Tucker ||  || align=right data-sort-value="0.82" | 820 m || 
|-id=542 bgcolor=#E9E9E9
| 572542 ||  || — || September 3, 2008 || Kitt Peak || Spacewatch ||  || align=right | 1.4 km || 
|-id=543 bgcolor=#E9E9E9
| 572543 ||  || — || February 2, 2006 || Kitt Peak || Spacewatch ||  || align=right | 1.8 km || 
|-id=544 bgcolor=#E9E9E9
| 572544 ||  || — || August 24, 2008 || Kitt Peak || Spacewatch ||  || align=right | 2.1 km || 
|-id=545 bgcolor=#E9E9E9
| 572545 ||  || — || September 3, 2008 || La Sagra || OAM Obs. ||  || align=right | 1.5 km || 
|-id=546 bgcolor=#d6d6d6
| 572546 ||  || — || September 2, 2008 || Kitt Peak || Spacewatch ||  || align=right | 1.7 km || 
|-id=547 bgcolor=#fefefe
| 572547 ||  || — || September 6, 2008 || Mount Lemmon || Mount Lemmon Survey ||  || align=right data-sort-value="0.75" | 750 m || 
|-id=548 bgcolor=#E9E9E9
| 572548 ||  || — || August 24, 2008 || Kitt Peak || Spacewatch ||  || align=right | 1.8 km || 
|-id=549 bgcolor=#E9E9E9
| 572549 ||  || — || September 3, 2008 || Kitt Peak || Spacewatch ||  || align=right | 1.2 km || 
|-id=550 bgcolor=#E9E9E9
| 572550 ||  || — || April 6, 2002 || Cerro Tololo || Cerro Tololo Obs. ||  || align=right | 1.7 km || 
|-id=551 bgcolor=#E9E9E9
| 572551 ||  || — || August 8, 2008 || La Sagra || OAM Obs. ||  || align=right | 1.3 km || 
|-id=552 bgcolor=#E9E9E9
| 572552 ||  || — || September 4, 2008 || Kitt Peak || Spacewatch ||  || align=right | 2.0 km || 
|-id=553 bgcolor=#E9E9E9
| 572553 ||  || — || September 4, 2008 || Kitt Peak || Spacewatch ||  || align=right | 1.3 km || 
|-id=554 bgcolor=#E9E9E9
| 572554 ||  || — || September 4, 2008 || Kitt Peak || Spacewatch ||  || align=right | 2.0 km || 
|-id=555 bgcolor=#fefefe
| 572555 ||  || — || September 4, 2008 || Kitt Peak || Spacewatch ||  || align=right data-sort-value="0.67" | 670 m || 
|-id=556 bgcolor=#fefefe
| 572556 ||  || — || September 6, 2008 || Mount Lemmon || Mount Lemmon Survey ||  || align=right data-sort-value="0.71" | 710 m || 
|-id=557 bgcolor=#E9E9E9
| 572557 ||  || — || December 2, 2005 || Kitt Peak || L. H. Wasserman, R. Millis ||  || align=right | 1.7 km || 
|-id=558 bgcolor=#fefefe
| 572558 ||  || — || August 21, 2008 || Kitt Peak || Spacewatch ||  || align=right data-sort-value="0.90" | 900 m || 
|-id=559 bgcolor=#fefefe
| 572559 ||  || — || September 6, 2008 || Mount Lemmon || Mount Lemmon Survey ||  || align=right data-sort-value="0.61" | 610 m || 
|-id=560 bgcolor=#E9E9E9
| 572560 ||  || — || November 10, 2004 || Kitt Peak || Spacewatch ||  || align=right | 3.4 km || 
|-id=561 bgcolor=#fefefe
| 572561 ||  || — || September 10, 2008 || Wrightwood || J. W. Young ||  || align=right data-sort-value="0.75" | 750 m || 
|-id=562 bgcolor=#E9E9E9
| 572562 ||  || — || September 4, 2008 || Kitt Peak || Spacewatch ||  || align=right | 1.2 km || 
|-id=563 bgcolor=#E9E9E9
| 572563 ||  || — || September 5, 2008 || Kitt Peak || Spacewatch ||  || align=right | 1.1 km || 
|-id=564 bgcolor=#fefefe
| 572564 ||  || — || September 9, 2008 || Mount Lemmon || Mount Lemmon Survey ||  || align=right data-sort-value="0.60" | 600 m || 
|-id=565 bgcolor=#E9E9E9
| 572565 ||  || — || September 3, 2008 || Kitt Peak || Spacewatch ||  || align=right | 1.5 km || 
|-id=566 bgcolor=#E9E9E9
| 572566 ||  || — || September 6, 2008 || Kitt Peak || Spacewatch ||  || align=right data-sort-value="0.97" | 970 m || 
|-id=567 bgcolor=#E9E9E9
| 572567 ||  || — || January 26, 2006 || Kitt Peak || Spacewatch ||  || align=right | 2.0 km || 
|-id=568 bgcolor=#fefefe
| 572568 ||  || — || April 25, 2014 || Mount Lemmon || Mount Lemmon Survey ||  || align=right data-sort-value="0.76" | 760 m || 
|-id=569 bgcolor=#FA8072
| 572569 ||  || — || September 9, 2008 || Catalina || CSS ||  || align=right data-sort-value="0.61" | 610 m || 
|-id=570 bgcolor=#fefefe
| 572570 ||  || — || September 3, 2008 || Kitt Peak || Spacewatch ||  || align=right data-sort-value="0.52" | 520 m || 
|-id=571 bgcolor=#fefefe
| 572571 ||  || — || September 7, 2008 || Mount Lemmon || Mount Lemmon Survey || H || align=right data-sort-value="0.57" | 570 m || 
|-id=572 bgcolor=#E9E9E9
| 572572 ||  || — || September 9, 2008 || Mount Lemmon || Mount Lemmon Survey ||  || align=right | 1.8 km || 
|-id=573 bgcolor=#fefefe
| 572573 ||  || — || September 6, 2008 || Kitt Peak || Spacewatch ||  || align=right data-sort-value="0.50" | 500 m || 
|-id=574 bgcolor=#E9E9E9
| 572574 ||  || — || March 7, 2002 || Siding Spring || R. H. McNaught ||  || align=right | 1.8 km || 
|-id=575 bgcolor=#E9E9E9
| 572575 ||  || — || September 7, 2008 || Mount Lemmon || Mount Lemmon Survey ||  || align=right | 1.7 km || 
|-id=576 bgcolor=#C2FFFF
| 572576 ||  || — || April 6, 2003 || Kitt Peak || Spacewatch || L4 || align=right | 9.6 km || 
|-id=577 bgcolor=#E9E9E9
| 572577 ||  || — || September 2, 2008 || Kitt Peak || Spacewatch ||  || align=right | 1.7 km || 
|-id=578 bgcolor=#d6d6d6
| 572578 ||  || — || January 27, 2006 || Mount Lemmon || Mount Lemmon Survey ||  || align=right | 2.9 km || 
|-id=579 bgcolor=#E9E9E9
| 572579 ||  || — || January 26, 2006 || Kitt Peak || Spacewatch ||  || align=right | 1.2 km || 
|-id=580 bgcolor=#fefefe
| 572580 ||  || — || September 12, 2008 || Piszkesteto || K. Sárneczky ||  || align=right data-sort-value="0.77" | 770 m || 
|-id=581 bgcolor=#E9E9E9
| 572581 ||  || — || September 5, 2008 || Kitt Peak || Spacewatch ||  || align=right | 2.1 km || 
|-id=582 bgcolor=#E9E9E9
| 572582 ||  || — || September 9, 2008 || Mount Lemmon || Mount Lemmon Survey ||  || align=right | 2.1 km || 
|-id=583 bgcolor=#E9E9E9
| 572583 ||  || — || September 5, 2008 || Kitt Peak || Spacewatch ||  || align=right | 1.6 km || 
|-id=584 bgcolor=#E9E9E9
| 572584 ||  || — || March 13, 2015 || Mount Lemmon || Mount Lemmon Survey ||  || align=right | 1.3 km || 
|-id=585 bgcolor=#fefefe
| 572585 ||  || — || April 30, 2014 || Haleakala || Pan-STARRS ||  || align=right data-sort-value="0.68" | 680 m || 
|-id=586 bgcolor=#E9E9E9
| 572586 ||  || — || July 30, 2008 || Kitt Peak || Spacewatch ||  || align=right | 1.7 km || 
|-id=587 bgcolor=#E9E9E9
| 572587 ||  || — || September 7, 2008 || Mount Lemmon || Mount Lemmon Survey ||  || align=right | 1.2 km || 
|-id=588 bgcolor=#E9E9E9
| 572588 ||  || — || September 6, 2008 || Mount Lemmon || Mount Lemmon Survey ||  || align=right | 1.3 km || 
|-id=589 bgcolor=#E9E9E9
| 572589 ||  || — || September 9, 2008 || Mount Lemmon || Mount Lemmon Survey ||  || align=right | 1.7 km || 
|-id=590 bgcolor=#E9E9E9
| 572590 ||  || — || September 7, 2008 || Mount Lemmon || Mount Lemmon Survey ||  || align=right | 1.7 km || 
|-id=591 bgcolor=#E9E9E9
| 572591 ||  || — || September 6, 2008 || Mount Lemmon || Mount Lemmon Survey ||  || align=right | 1.4 km || 
|-id=592 bgcolor=#E9E9E9
| 572592 ||  || — || September 4, 2008 || Kitt Peak || Spacewatch ||  || align=right | 1.2 km || 
|-id=593 bgcolor=#E9E9E9
| 572593 ||  || — || September 9, 2008 || Catalina || CSS ||  || align=right | 1.7 km || 
|-id=594 bgcolor=#E9E9E9
| 572594 ||  || — || September 6, 2008 || Mount Lemmon || Mount Lemmon Survey ||  || align=right | 1.4 km || 
|-id=595 bgcolor=#E9E9E9
| 572595 ||  || — || September 9, 2008 || Bergisch Gladbach || W. Bickel ||  || align=right | 2.0 km || 
|-id=596 bgcolor=#E9E9E9
| 572596 ||  || — || September 5, 2008 || Kitt Peak || Spacewatch ||  || align=right | 1.1 km || 
|-id=597 bgcolor=#E9E9E9
| 572597 ||  || — || September 3, 2008 || Kitt Peak || Spacewatch ||  || align=right | 1.4 km || 
|-id=598 bgcolor=#d6d6d6
| 572598 ||  || — || January 30, 2011 || Mount Lemmon || Mount Lemmon Survey ||  || align=right | 2.5 km || 
|-id=599 bgcolor=#fefefe
| 572599 ||  || — || September 3, 2008 || Kitt Peak || Spacewatch ||  || align=right data-sort-value="0.54" | 540 m || 
|-id=600 bgcolor=#d6d6d6
| 572600 ||  || — || September 4, 2008 || Kitt Peak || Spacewatch ||  || align=right | 2.3 km || 
|}

572601–572700 

|-bgcolor=#fefefe
| 572601 ||  || — || February 21, 2017 || Haleakala || Pan-STARRS ||  || align=right data-sort-value="0.56" | 560 m || 
|-id=602 bgcolor=#E9E9E9
| 572602 ||  || — || October 4, 2013 || Mount Lemmon || Mount Lemmon Survey ||  || align=right | 2.0 km || 
|-id=603 bgcolor=#E9E9E9
| 572603 ||  || — || January 17, 2015 || Mount Lemmon || Mount Lemmon Survey ||  || align=right | 1.7 km || 
|-id=604 bgcolor=#E9E9E9
| 572604 ||  || — || September 7, 2008 || Mount Lemmon || Mount Lemmon Survey ||  || align=right | 1.2 km || 
|-id=605 bgcolor=#fefefe
| 572605 ||  || — || October 22, 2012 || Mount Lemmon || Mount Lemmon Survey ||  || align=right data-sort-value="0.65" | 650 m || 
|-id=606 bgcolor=#E9E9E9
| 572606 ||  || — || September 7, 2008 || Mount Lemmon || Mount Lemmon Survey ||  || align=right | 2.0 km || 
|-id=607 bgcolor=#fefefe
| 572607 ||  || — || September 5, 2008 || Kitt Peak || Spacewatch ||  || align=right data-sort-value="0.57" | 570 m || 
|-id=608 bgcolor=#E9E9E9
| 572608 ||  || — || October 12, 2013 || Kitt Peak || Spacewatch ||  || align=right | 2.0 km || 
|-id=609 bgcolor=#E9E9E9
| 572609 ||  || — || September 6, 2008 || Kitt Peak || Spacewatch ||  || align=right | 1.1 km || 
|-id=610 bgcolor=#d6d6d6
| 572610 ||  || — || September 3, 2008 || Kitt Peak || Spacewatch || 7:4 || align=right | 3.4 km || 
|-id=611 bgcolor=#C2FFFF
| 572611 ||  || — || September 3, 2008 || Kitt Peak || Spacewatch || L4 || align=right | 6.1 km || 
|-id=612 bgcolor=#FA8072
| 572612 ||  || — || September 7, 2008 || Catalina || CSS ||  || align=right data-sort-value="0.84" | 840 m || 
|-id=613 bgcolor=#E9E9E9
| 572613 ||  || — || September 23, 2008 || Mount Lemmon || Mount Lemmon Survey || MRX || align=right | 1.4 km || 
|-id=614 bgcolor=#fefefe
| 572614 ||  || — || August 31, 2008 || Moletai || K. Černis, J. Zdanavičius ||  || align=right data-sort-value="0.91" | 910 m || 
|-id=615 bgcolor=#E9E9E9
| 572615 ||  || — || September 22, 2008 || Catalina || CSS ||  || align=right | 2.7 km || 
|-id=616 bgcolor=#E9E9E9
| 572616 ||  || — || September 24, 2008 || Mount Lemmon || Mount Lemmon Survey ||  || align=right | 1.9 km || 
|-id=617 bgcolor=#E9E9E9
| 572617 ||  || — || September 19, 2008 || Kitt Peak || Spacewatch ||  || align=right | 2.0 km || 
|-id=618 bgcolor=#fefefe
| 572618 ||  || — || September 19, 2008 || Kitt Peak || Spacewatch ||  || align=right data-sort-value="0.90" | 900 m || 
|-id=619 bgcolor=#E9E9E9
| 572619 ||  || — || August 7, 2008 || Kitt Peak || Spacewatch ||  || align=right | 1.1 km || 
|-id=620 bgcolor=#E9E9E9
| 572620 ||  || — || September 19, 2008 || Kitt Peak || Spacewatch ||  || align=right | 1.3 km || 
|-id=621 bgcolor=#E9E9E9
| 572621 ||  || — || September 19, 2008 || Kitt Peak || Spacewatch ||  || align=right | 1.1 km || 
|-id=622 bgcolor=#C2FFFF
| 572622 ||  || — || April 5, 2003 || Kitt Peak || Spacewatch || L4 || align=right | 7.8 km || 
|-id=623 bgcolor=#E9E9E9
| 572623 ||  || — || December 1, 2005 || Kitt Peak || L. H. Wasserman, R. Millis ||  || align=right | 1.8 km || 
|-id=624 bgcolor=#E9E9E9
| 572624 ||  || — || January 28, 2006 || Mount Lemmon || Mount Lemmon Survey ||  || align=right | 2.0 km || 
|-id=625 bgcolor=#fefefe
| 572625 ||  || — || September 6, 2008 || Kitt Peak || Spacewatch ||  || align=right data-sort-value="0.57" | 570 m || 
|-id=626 bgcolor=#E9E9E9
| 572626 ||  || — || August 24, 2008 || Kitt Peak || Spacewatch ||  || align=right | 1.6 km || 
|-id=627 bgcolor=#E9E9E9
| 572627 ||  || — || May 26, 2003 || Kitt Peak || Spacewatch ||  || align=right | 1.6 km || 
|-id=628 bgcolor=#E9E9E9
| 572628 ||  || — || August 21, 2008 || Kitt Peak || Spacewatch ||  || align=right | 1.3 km || 
|-id=629 bgcolor=#E9E9E9
| 572629 ||  || — || September 5, 2008 || Kitt Peak || Spacewatch ||  || align=right | 1.2 km || 
|-id=630 bgcolor=#fefefe
| 572630 ||  || — || September 3, 2008 || Kitt Peak || Spacewatch ||  || align=right data-sort-value="0.64" | 640 m || 
|-id=631 bgcolor=#E9E9E9
| 572631 ||  || — || September 20, 2008 || Mount Lemmon || Mount Lemmon Survey ||  || align=right | 1.2 km || 
|-id=632 bgcolor=#E9E9E9
| 572632 ||  || — || September 20, 2008 || Kitt Peak || Spacewatch ||  || align=right | 1.9 km || 
|-id=633 bgcolor=#E9E9E9
| 572633 ||  || — || September 22, 2008 || Kitt Peak || Spacewatch ||  || align=right | 1.4 km || 
|-id=634 bgcolor=#E9E9E9
| 572634 ||  || — || August 24, 2008 || Kitt Peak || Spacewatch ||  || align=right | 1.6 km || 
|-id=635 bgcolor=#E9E9E9
| 572635 ||  || — || October 17, 1995 || Kitt Peak || Spacewatch ||  || align=right | 1.2 km || 
|-id=636 bgcolor=#E9E9E9
| 572636 ||  || — || September 27, 2008 || Taunus || Taunus Obs. ||  || align=right | 1.7 km || 
|-id=637 bgcolor=#fefefe
| 572637 ||  || — || September 21, 2008 || Kitt Peak || Spacewatch ||  || align=right data-sort-value="0.59" | 590 m || 
|-id=638 bgcolor=#E9E9E9
| 572638 ||  || — || September 21, 2008 || Kitt Peak || Spacewatch ||  || align=right | 1.6 km || 
|-id=639 bgcolor=#fefefe
| 572639 ||  || — || March 10, 2007 || Mount Lemmon || Mount Lemmon Survey ||  || align=right data-sort-value="0.66" | 660 m || 
|-id=640 bgcolor=#E9E9E9
| 572640 ||  || — || September 21, 2008 || Kitt Peak || Spacewatch ||  || align=right | 1.7 km || 
|-id=641 bgcolor=#E9E9E9
| 572641 ||  || — || September 21, 2008 || Kitt Peak || Spacewatch ||  || align=right | 1.8 km || 
|-id=642 bgcolor=#E9E9E9
| 572642 ||  || — || September 4, 2008 || Kitt Peak || Spacewatch ||  || align=right | 1.8 km || 
|-id=643 bgcolor=#fefefe
| 572643 ||  || — || September 22, 2008 || Mount Lemmon || Mount Lemmon Survey ||  || align=right data-sort-value="0.52" | 520 m || 
|-id=644 bgcolor=#E9E9E9
| 572644 ||  || — || September 22, 2008 || Mount Lemmon || Mount Lemmon Survey ||  || align=right | 1.8 km || 
|-id=645 bgcolor=#E9E9E9
| 572645 ||  || — || September 22, 2008 || Mount Lemmon || Mount Lemmon Survey ||  || align=right | 1.8 km || 
|-id=646 bgcolor=#E9E9E9
| 572646 ||  || — || September 22, 2008 || Mount Lemmon || Mount Lemmon Survey ||  || align=right | 1.3 km || 
|-id=647 bgcolor=#E9E9E9
| 572647 ||  || — || September 22, 2008 || Kitt Peak || Spacewatch ||  || align=right | 1.3 km || 
|-id=648 bgcolor=#E9E9E9
| 572648 ||  || — || September 23, 2008 || Kitt Peak || Spacewatch ||  || align=right | 1.4 km || 
|-id=649 bgcolor=#E9E9E9
| 572649 ||  || — || September 23, 2008 || Kitt Peak || Spacewatch ||  || align=right | 1.6 km || 
|-id=650 bgcolor=#E9E9E9
| 572650 ||  || — || September 28, 2003 || Kitt Peak || Spacewatch || MRX || align=right data-sort-value="0.86" | 860 m || 
|-id=651 bgcolor=#E9E9E9
| 572651 ||  || — || September 24, 2008 || Mount Lemmon || Mount Lemmon Survey ||  || align=right | 2.0 km || 
|-id=652 bgcolor=#fefefe
| 572652 ||  || — || September 6, 2008 || Mount Lemmon || Mount Lemmon Survey ||  || align=right data-sort-value="0.49" | 490 m || 
|-id=653 bgcolor=#E9E9E9
| 572653 ||  || — || September 6, 2008 || Catalina || CSS ||  || align=right | 1.4 km || 
|-id=654 bgcolor=#E9E9E9
| 572654 ||  || — || September 5, 2008 || Goodricke-Pigott || R. A. Tucker ||  || align=right | 2.0 km || 
|-id=655 bgcolor=#fefefe
| 572655 ||  || — || September 24, 2008 || Socorro || LINEAR ||  || align=right data-sort-value="0.78" | 780 m || 
|-id=656 bgcolor=#E9E9E9
| 572656 ||  || — || September 19, 2008 || Kitt Peak || Spacewatch ||  || align=right | 1.5 km || 
|-id=657 bgcolor=#E9E9E9
| 572657 ||  || — || September 27, 2008 || Andrushivka || P. Ostafijchuk, Y. Ivaščenko ||  || align=right | 2.5 km || 
|-id=658 bgcolor=#fefefe
| 572658 ||  || — || September 23, 2008 || Mount Lemmon || Mount Lemmon Survey || H || align=right data-sort-value="0.61" | 610 m || 
|-id=659 bgcolor=#C2FFFF
| 572659 ||  || — || September 24, 2008 || Bergisch Gladbach || W. Bickel || L4 || align=right | 7.5 km || 
|-id=660 bgcolor=#E9E9E9
| 572660 ||  || — || September 25, 2008 || Kitt Peak || Spacewatch ||  || align=right | 1.7 km || 
|-id=661 bgcolor=#E9E9E9
| 572661 ||  || — || September 25, 2008 || Kitt Peak || Spacewatch || EUN || align=right data-sort-value="0.72" | 720 m || 
|-id=662 bgcolor=#E9E9E9
| 572662 ||  || — || September 25, 2008 || Kitt Peak || Spacewatch ||  || align=right | 1.6 km || 
|-id=663 bgcolor=#E9E9E9
| 572663 ||  || — || September 25, 2008 || Kitt Peak || Spacewatch ||  || align=right | 2.3 km || 
|-id=664 bgcolor=#E9E9E9
| 572664 ||  || — || September 25, 2008 || Kitt Peak || Spacewatch ||  || align=right | 1.6 km || 
|-id=665 bgcolor=#E9E9E9
| 572665 ||  || — || September 21, 2003 || Palomar || NEAT ||  || align=right | 2.0 km || 
|-id=666 bgcolor=#E9E9E9
| 572666 ||  || — || September 6, 2008 || Mount Lemmon || Mount Lemmon Survey ||  || align=right | 2.1 km || 
|-id=667 bgcolor=#fefefe
| 572667 ||  || — || April 20, 2007 || Kitt Peak || Spacewatch ||  || align=right data-sort-value="0.77" | 770 m || 
|-id=668 bgcolor=#E9E9E9
| 572668 ||  || — || September 21, 2008 || Kitt Peak || Spacewatch ||  || align=right | 2.1 km || 
|-id=669 bgcolor=#E9E9E9
| 572669 ||  || — || September 28, 2008 || Catalina || CSS ||  || align=right | 1.6 km || 
|-id=670 bgcolor=#E9E9E9
| 572670 ||  || — || September 29, 2008 || Mount Lemmon || Mount Lemmon Survey ||  || align=right | 1.1 km || 
|-id=671 bgcolor=#d6d6d6
| 572671 ||  || — || September 25, 2008 || Mount Lemmon || Mount Lemmon Survey ||  || align=right | 2.5 km || 
|-id=672 bgcolor=#E9E9E9
| 572672 ||  || — || September 26, 2008 || Kitt Peak || Spacewatch ||  || align=right | 1.5 km || 
|-id=673 bgcolor=#E9E9E9
| 572673 ||  || — || April 7, 2007 || Mount Lemmon || Mount Lemmon Survey ||  || align=right | 1.4 km || 
|-id=674 bgcolor=#E9E9E9
| 572674 ||  || — || September 28, 2008 || Mount Lemmon || Mount Lemmon Survey ||  || align=right | 2.0 km || 
|-id=675 bgcolor=#E9E9E9
| 572675 ||  || — || November 11, 2004 || Kitt Peak || Kitt Peak Obs. ||  || align=right | 1.9 km || 
|-id=676 bgcolor=#E9E9E9
| 572676 ||  || — || September 28, 2008 || Mount Lemmon || Mount Lemmon Survey ||  || align=right | 1.7 km || 
|-id=677 bgcolor=#E9E9E9
| 572677 ||  || — || November 17, 2004 || Campo Imperatore || CINEOS ||  || align=right | 2.0 km || 
|-id=678 bgcolor=#fefefe
| 572678 ||  || — || September 2, 2008 || Kitt Peak || Spacewatch ||  || align=right data-sort-value="0.62" | 620 m || 
|-id=679 bgcolor=#fefefe
| 572679 ||  || — || September 2, 2008 || Kitt Peak || Spacewatch ||  || align=right data-sort-value="0.58" | 580 m || 
|-id=680 bgcolor=#fefefe
| 572680 ||  || — || March 11, 2007 || Mount Lemmon || Mount Lemmon Survey ||  || align=right data-sort-value="0.62" | 620 m || 
|-id=681 bgcolor=#E9E9E9
| 572681 ||  || — || May 12, 2007 || Mount Lemmon || Mount Lemmon Survey ||  || align=right | 1.5 km || 
|-id=682 bgcolor=#fefefe
| 572682 ||  || — || November 6, 2005 || Mount Lemmon || Mount Lemmon Survey ||  || align=right data-sort-value="0.54" | 540 m || 
|-id=683 bgcolor=#E9E9E9
| 572683 ||  || — || September 24, 2008 || Kitt Peak || Spacewatch ||  || align=right | 1.6 km || 
|-id=684 bgcolor=#fefefe
| 572684 ||  || — || September 24, 2008 || Kitt Peak || Spacewatch ||  || align=right data-sort-value="0.55" | 550 m || 
|-id=685 bgcolor=#E9E9E9
| 572685 ||  || — || September 25, 2008 || Kitt Peak || Spacewatch ||  || align=right | 1.6 km || 
|-id=686 bgcolor=#E9E9E9
| 572686 ||  || — || September 22, 2008 || Mount Lemmon || Mount Lemmon Survey || PAD || align=right | 1.4 km || 
|-id=687 bgcolor=#E9E9E9
| 572687 ||  || — || September 25, 2008 || Kitt Peak || Spacewatch ||  || align=right | 1.9 km || 
|-id=688 bgcolor=#C2FFFF
| 572688 ||  || — || September 19, 2008 || Kitt Peak || Spacewatch || L4 || align=right | 7.8 km || 
|-id=689 bgcolor=#E9E9E9
| 572689 ||  || — || September 26, 2008 || Kitt Peak || Spacewatch ||  || align=right | 1.6 km || 
|-id=690 bgcolor=#E9E9E9
| 572690 ||  || — || October 4, 1999 || Kitt Peak || Spacewatch ||  || align=right | 2.1 km || 
|-id=691 bgcolor=#fefefe
| 572691 ||  || — || September 23, 2008 || Socorro || LINEAR ||  || align=right data-sort-value="0.77" | 770 m || 
|-id=692 bgcolor=#E9E9E9
| 572692 ||  || — || September 24, 2008 || Mount Lemmon || Mount Lemmon Survey ||  || align=right | 1.4 km || 
|-id=693 bgcolor=#E9E9E9
| 572693 ||  || — || September 23, 2008 || Mount Lemmon || Mount Lemmon Survey ||  || align=right | 2.3 km || 
|-id=694 bgcolor=#E9E9E9
| 572694 ||  || — || September 21, 2008 || Kitt Peak || Spacewatch ||  || align=right | 1.9 km || 
|-id=695 bgcolor=#E9E9E9
| 572695 ||  || — || September 25, 2008 || Kitt Peak || Spacewatch ||  || align=right | 1.2 km || 
|-id=696 bgcolor=#fefefe
| 572696 ||  || — || September 22, 2008 || Mount Lemmon || Mount Lemmon Survey ||  || align=right data-sort-value="0.72" | 720 m || 
|-id=697 bgcolor=#E9E9E9
| 572697 ||  || — || September 24, 2008 || Mount Lemmon || Mount Lemmon Survey ||  || align=right | 2.4 km || 
|-id=698 bgcolor=#fefefe
| 572698 ||  || — || February 17, 2010 || Kitt Peak || Spacewatch ||  || align=right data-sort-value="0.71" | 710 m || 
|-id=699 bgcolor=#E9E9E9
| 572699 ||  || — || September 23, 2008 || Mount Lemmon || Mount Lemmon Survey ||  || align=right | 1.5 km || 
|-id=700 bgcolor=#E9E9E9
| 572700 ||  || — || September 22, 2008 || Kitt Peak || Spacewatch ||  || align=right | 1.6 km || 
|}

572701–572800 

|-bgcolor=#E9E9E9
| 572701 ||  || — || September 20, 2008 || Mount Lemmon || Mount Lemmon Survey ||  || align=right | 1.3 km || 
|-id=702 bgcolor=#E9E9E9
| 572702 ||  || — || September 21, 2008 || Mount Lemmon || Mount Lemmon Survey ||  || align=right | 1.2 km || 
|-id=703 bgcolor=#E9E9E9
| 572703 ||  || — || September 24, 2008 || Mount Lemmon || Mount Lemmon Survey ||  || align=right | 1.7 km || 
|-id=704 bgcolor=#E9E9E9
| 572704 ||  || — || September 28, 2008 || Mount Lemmon || Mount Lemmon Survey ||  || align=right | 1.7 km || 
|-id=705 bgcolor=#E9E9E9
| 572705 ||  || — || December 15, 2004 || Socorro || LINEAR ||  || align=right | 1.4 km || 
|-id=706 bgcolor=#E9E9E9
| 572706 ||  || — || September 29, 2008 || Mount Lemmon || Mount Lemmon Survey ||  || align=right | 1.7 km || 
|-id=707 bgcolor=#fefefe
| 572707 ||  || — || July 30, 2008 || Mount Lemmon || Mount Lemmon Survey ||  || align=right data-sort-value="0.71" | 710 m || 
|-id=708 bgcolor=#fefefe
| 572708 ||  || — || September 22, 2008 || Kitt Peak || Spacewatch ||  || align=right data-sort-value="0.59" | 590 m || 
|-id=709 bgcolor=#E9E9E9
| 572709 ||  || — || September 25, 2008 || Kitt Peak || Spacewatch ||  || align=right | 1.5 km || 
|-id=710 bgcolor=#fefefe
| 572710 ||  || — || September 23, 2008 || Mount Lemmon || Mount Lemmon Survey ||  || align=right data-sort-value="0.62" | 620 m || 
|-id=711 bgcolor=#E9E9E9
| 572711 ||  || — || September 23, 2008 || Kitt Peak || Spacewatch ||  || align=right | 1.7 km || 
|-id=712 bgcolor=#E9E9E9
| 572712 ||  || — || September 23, 2008 || Kitt Peak || Spacewatch ||  || align=right | 1.8 km || 
|-id=713 bgcolor=#E9E9E9
| 572713 ||  || — || September 24, 2008 || Mount Lemmon || Mount Lemmon Survey ||  || align=right | 1.2 km || 
|-id=714 bgcolor=#E9E9E9
| 572714 ||  || — || August 4, 2017 || Haleakala || Pan-STARRS ||  || align=right | 1.2 km || 
|-id=715 bgcolor=#E9E9E9
| 572715 ||  || — || May 3, 2016 || Mount Lemmon || Mount Lemmon Survey ||  || align=right | 1.4 km || 
|-id=716 bgcolor=#fefefe
| 572716 ||  || — || September 25, 2008 || Kitt Peak || Spacewatch ||  || align=right data-sort-value="0.55" | 550 m || 
|-id=717 bgcolor=#fefefe
| 572717 ||  || — || September 23, 2008 || Kitt Peak || Spacewatch || H || align=right data-sort-value="0.39" | 390 m || 
|-id=718 bgcolor=#fefefe
| 572718 ||  || — || November 19, 2015 || Mount Lemmon || Mount Lemmon Survey ||  || align=right data-sort-value="0.62" | 620 m || 
|-id=719 bgcolor=#fefefe
| 572719 ||  || — || September 20, 2008 || Kitt Peak || Spacewatch ||  || align=right data-sort-value="0.82" | 820 m || 
|-id=720 bgcolor=#E9E9E9
| 572720 ||  || — || September 23, 2008 || Mount Lemmon || Mount Lemmon Survey ||  || align=right | 1.6 km || 
|-id=721 bgcolor=#E9E9E9
| 572721 ||  || — || September 24, 2008 || Mount Lemmon || Mount Lemmon Survey ||  || align=right | 1.3 km || 
|-id=722 bgcolor=#E9E9E9
| 572722 ||  || — || September 24, 2008 || Mount Lemmon || Mount Lemmon Survey ||  || align=right | 1.4 km || 
|-id=723 bgcolor=#fefefe
| 572723 ||  || — || September 24, 2008 || Kitt Peak || Spacewatch ||  || align=right data-sort-value="0.59" | 590 m || 
|-id=724 bgcolor=#E9E9E9
| 572724 ||  || — || September 22, 2008 || Kitt Peak || Spacewatch ||  || align=right | 1.6 km || 
|-id=725 bgcolor=#d6d6d6
| 572725 ||  || — || September 25, 2008 || Kitt Peak || Spacewatch ||  || align=right | 2.0 km || 
|-id=726 bgcolor=#fefefe
| 572726 ||  || — || September 24, 2008 || Mount Lemmon || Mount Lemmon Survey ||  || align=right data-sort-value="0.64" | 640 m || 
|-id=727 bgcolor=#E9E9E9
| 572727 ||  || — || September 23, 2008 || Kitt Peak || Spacewatch ||  || align=right | 2.2 km || 
|-id=728 bgcolor=#E9E9E9
| 572728 ||  || — || September 26, 2008 || Kitt Peak || Spacewatch ||  || align=right | 1.8 km || 
|-id=729 bgcolor=#E9E9E9
| 572729 ||  || — || September 26, 2008 || Kitt Peak || Spacewatch ||  || align=right | 1.5 km || 
|-id=730 bgcolor=#E9E9E9
| 572730 ||  || — || September 10, 2004 || Kitt Peak || Spacewatch ||  || align=right data-sort-value="0.62" | 620 m || 
|-id=731 bgcolor=#d6d6d6
| 572731 ||  || — || September 27, 2003 || Kitt Peak || Spacewatch ||  || align=right | 1.8 km || 
|-id=732 bgcolor=#fefefe
| 572732 ||  || — || September 3, 2008 || Kitt Peak || Spacewatch ||  || align=right data-sort-value="0.54" | 540 m || 
|-id=733 bgcolor=#E9E9E9
| 572733 ||  || — || October 1, 2008 || Mount Lemmon || Mount Lemmon Survey ||  || align=right | 1.7 km || 
|-id=734 bgcolor=#E9E9E9
| 572734 ||  || — || October 1, 2008 || Mount Lemmon || Mount Lemmon Survey ||  || align=right | 1.7 km || 
|-id=735 bgcolor=#d6d6d6
| 572735 ||  || — || September 4, 2008 || Kitt Peak || Spacewatch ||  || align=right | 1.7 km || 
|-id=736 bgcolor=#E9E9E9
| 572736 ||  || — || September 19, 2008 || Kitt Peak || Spacewatch ||  || align=right | 1.7 km || 
|-id=737 bgcolor=#E9E9E9
| 572737 ||  || — || October 1, 2008 || Junk Bond || D. Healy ||  || align=right | 2.3 km || 
|-id=738 bgcolor=#fefefe
| 572738 ||  || — || October 1, 2008 || Mount Lemmon || Mount Lemmon Survey || H || align=right data-sort-value="0.49" | 490 m || 
|-id=739 bgcolor=#E9E9E9
| 572739 ||  || — || October 1, 2008 || Mount Lemmon || Mount Lemmon Survey ||  || align=right | 1.6 km || 
|-id=740 bgcolor=#E9E9E9
| 572740 ||  || — || November 20, 2003 || Kitt Peak || Kitt Peak Obs. || AGN || align=right data-sort-value="0.82" | 820 m || 
|-id=741 bgcolor=#E9E9E9
| 572741 ||  || — || October 1, 2008 || Kitt Peak || Spacewatch ||  || align=right | 2.2 km || 
|-id=742 bgcolor=#E9E9E9
| 572742 ||  || — || February 7, 2006 || Kitt Peak || Spacewatch ||  || align=right | 2.2 km || 
|-id=743 bgcolor=#E9E9E9
| 572743 ||  || — || September 24, 2008 || Kitt Peak || Spacewatch ||  || align=right | 1.5 km || 
|-id=744 bgcolor=#E9E9E9
| 572744 ||  || — || October 2, 2008 || Kitt Peak || Spacewatch ||  || align=right | 1.6 km || 
|-id=745 bgcolor=#d6d6d6
| 572745 ||  || — || September 30, 2003 || Kitt Peak || Spacewatch ||  || align=right | 1.9 km || 
|-id=746 bgcolor=#E9E9E9
| 572746 ||  || — || October 2, 2008 || Kitt Peak || Spacewatch ||  || align=right | 2.1 km || 
|-id=747 bgcolor=#E9E9E9
| 572747 ||  || — || September 24, 2008 || Kitt Peak || Spacewatch ||  || align=right | 2.0 km || 
|-id=748 bgcolor=#E9E9E9
| 572748 ||  || — || September 25, 2008 || Kitt Peak || Spacewatch ||  || align=right | 2.4 km || 
|-id=749 bgcolor=#fefefe
| 572749 ||  || — || October 3, 2008 || Kitt Peak || Spacewatch ||  || align=right data-sort-value="0.78" | 780 m || 
|-id=750 bgcolor=#E9E9E9
| 572750 ||  || — || October 3, 2008 || Kitt Peak || Spacewatch ||  || align=right | 1.9 km || 
|-id=751 bgcolor=#E9E9E9
| 572751 ||  || — || October 6, 2008 || Kitt Peak || Spacewatch ||  || align=right | 1.7 km || 
|-id=752 bgcolor=#fefefe
| 572752 ||  || — || September 5, 2008 || Kitt Peak || Spacewatch ||  || align=right data-sort-value="0.48" | 480 m || 
|-id=753 bgcolor=#fefefe
| 572753 ||  || — || October 6, 2008 || Kitt Peak || Spacewatch ||  || align=right data-sort-value="0.67" | 670 m || 
|-id=754 bgcolor=#E9E9E9
| 572754 ||  || — || October 6, 2008 || Kitt Peak || Spacewatch ||  || align=right | 1.7 km || 
|-id=755 bgcolor=#fefefe
| 572755 ||  || — || September 29, 2008 || Catalina || CSS ||  || align=right data-sort-value="0.49" | 490 m || 
|-id=756 bgcolor=#E9E9E9
| 572756 ||  || — || March 16, 2001 || Kitt Peak || Spacewatch ||  || align=right | 2.2 km || 
|-id=757 bgcolor=#d6d6d6
| 572757 ||  || — || September 9, 2008 || Mount Lemmon || Mount Lemmon Survey || 7:4 || align=right | 3.3 km || 
|-id=758 bgcolor=#E9E9E9
| 572758 ||  || — || November 3, 2004 || Kitt Peak || Spacewatch ||  || align=right | 1.2 km || 
|-id=759 bgcolor=#d6d6d6
| 572759 ||  || — || October 7, 2008 || Kitt Peak || Spacewatch ||  || align=right | 2.2 km || 
|-id=760 bgcolor=#FA8072
| 572760 ||  || — || September 2, 2008 || Kitt Peak || Spacewatch ||  || align=right data-sort-value="0.36" | 360 m || 
|-id=761 bgcolor=#E9E9E9
| 572761 ||  || — || October 8, 2008 || Mount Lemmon || Mount Lemmon Survey ||  || align=right | 1.9 km || 
|-id=762 bgcolor=#E9E9E9
| 572762 ||  || — || December 3, 2005 || Mauna Kea || Mauna Kea Obs. ||  || align=right | 2.0 km || 
|-id=763 bgcolor=#fefefe
| 572763 ||  || — || September 22, 2008 || Kitt Peak || Spacewatch ||  || align=right data-sort-value="0.63" | 630 m || 
|-id=764 bgcolor=#E9E9E9
| 572764 ||  || — || October 8, 2008 || Mount Lemmon || Mount Lemmon Survey || AGN || align=right data-sort-value="0.95" | 950 m || 
|-id=765 bgcolor=#E9E9E9
| 572765 ||  || — || September 23, 2008 || Kitt Peak || Spacewatch ||  || align=right | 2.0 km || 
|-id=766 bgcolor=#E9E9E9
| 572766 ||  || — || October 9, 2008 || Mount Lemmon || Mount Lemmon Survey ||  || align=right | 1.9 km || 
|-id=767 bgcolor=#fefefe
| 572767 ||  || — || September 23, 2008 || Mount Lemmon || Mount Lemmon Survey ||  || align=right data-sort-value="0.65" | 650 m || 
|-id=768 bgcolor=#E9E9E9
| 572768 ||  || — || March 2, 2006 || Kitt Peak || Spacewatch ||  || align=right | 1.8 km || 
|-id=769 bgcolor=#E9E9E9
| 572769 ||  || — || September 3, 2008 || Kitt Peak || Spacewatch ||  || align=right | 1.9 km || 
|-id=770 bgcolor=#fefefe
| 572770 ||  || — || September 28, 2008 || Mount Lemmon || Mount Lemmon Survey ||  || align=right data-sort-value="0.64" | 640 m || 
|-id=771 bgcolor=#E9E9E9
| 572771 ||  || — || September 3, 2008 || Kitt Peak || Spacewatch ||  || align=right | 1.8 km || 
|-id=772 bgcolor=#E9E9E9
| 572772 ||  || — || October 9, 2008 || Mount Lemmon || Mount Lemmon Survey ||  || align=right | 2.2 km || 
|-id=773 bgcolor=#fefefe
| 572773 ||  || — || October 7, 2008 || Kitt Peak || Spacewatch ||  || align=right data-sort-value="0.62" | 620 m || 
|-id=774 bgcolor=#E9E9E9
| 572774 ||  || — || October 8, 2008 || Mount Lemmon || Mount Lemmon Survey ||  || align=right | 1.9 km || 
|-id=775 bgcolor=#E9E9E9
| 572775 ||  || — || October 1, 2008 || Catalina || CSS || JUN || align=right | 1.1 km || 
|-id=776 bgcolor=#E9E9E9
| 572776 ||  || — || October 6, 2008 || Mount Lemmon || Mount Lemmon Survey ||  || align=right | 1.9 km || 
|-id=777 bgcolor=#E9E9E9
| 572777 ||  || — || September 4, 2008 || Kitt Peak || Spacewatch ||  || align=right | 1.2 km || 
|-id=778 bgcolor=#E9E9E9
| 572778 ||  || — || October 8, 2008 || Kitt Peak || Spacewatch ||  || align=right | 1.6 km || 
|-id=779 bgcolor=#E9E9E9
| 572779 ||  || — || October 6, 2008 || Mount Lemmon || Mount Lemmon Survey ||  || align=right | 2.1 km || 
|-id=780 bgcolor=#E9E9E9
| 572780 ||  || — || August 3, 2017 || Haleakala || Pan-STARRS ||  || align=right | 1.4 km || 
|-id=781 bgcolor=#E9E9E9
| 572781 ||  || — || October 9, 2008 || Mount Lemmon || Mount Lemmon Survey ||  || align=right | 2.3 km || 
|-id=782 bgcolor=#E9E9E9
| 572782 ||  || — || November 28, 2013 || Mount Lemmon || Mount Lemmon Survey ||  || align=right | 1.7 km || 
|-id=783 bgcolor=#E9E9E9
| 572783 ||  || — || October 2, 2008 || Kitt Peak || Spacewatch ||  || align=right | 1.7 km || 
|-id=784 bgcolor=#E9E9E9
| 572784 ||  || — || October 7, 2008 || Mount Lemmon || Mount Lemmon Survey ||  || align=right | 1.9 km || 
|-id=785 bgcolor=#E9E9E9
| 572785 ||  || — || October 2, 2008 || Kitt Peak || Spacewatch ||  || align=right | 1.7 km || 
|-id=786 bgcolor=#fefefe
| 572786 ||  || — || October 10, 2008 || Mount Lemmon || Mount Lemmon Survey ||  || align=right data-sort-value="0.53" | 530 m || 
|-id=787 bgcolor=#E9E9E9
| 572787 ||  || — || October 6, 2008 || Mount Lemmon || Mount Lemmon Survey ||  || align=right | 1.2 km || 
|-id=788 bgcolor=#E9E9E9
| 572788 ||  || — || October 2, 2008 || Mount Lemmon || Mount Lemmon Survey ||  || align=right | 1.2 km || 
|-id=789 bgcolor=#E9E9E9
| 572789 ||  || — || October 2, 2008 || Kitt Peak || Spacewatch ||  || align=right | 2.3 km || 
|-id=790 bgcolor=#E9E9E9
| 572790 ||  || — || October 10, 2008 || Mount Lemmon || Mount Lemmon Survey ||  || align=right | 1.5 km || 
|-id=791 bgcolor=#E9E9E9
| 572791 ||  || — || October 9, 2008 || Kitt Peak || Spacewatch ||  || align=right | 1.6 km || 
|-id=792 bgcolor=#E9E9E9
| 572792 ||  || — || January 28, 2015 || Haleakala || Pan-STARRS ||  || align=right | 1.8 km || 
|-id=793 bgcolor=#E9E9E9
| 572793 ||  || — || October 8, 2008 || Kitt Peak || Spacewatch ||  || align=right | 1.8 km || 
|-id=794 bgcolor=#E9E9E9
| 572794 ||  || — || February 10, 2015 || Mount Lemmon || Mount Lemmon Survey ||  || align=right | 1.6 km || 
|-id=795 bgcolor=#E9E9E9
| 572795 ||  || — || October 2, 2008 || Kitt Peak || Spacewatch ||  || align=right | 1.8 km || 
|-id=796 bgcolor=#E9E9E9
| 572796 ||  || — || October 6, 2004 || Kitt Peak || Spacewatch ||  || align=right | 1.4 km || 
|-id=797 bgcolor=#E9E9E9
| 572797 ||  || — || January 28, 2015 || Haleakala || Pan-STARRS ||  || align=right | 1.2 km || 
|-id=798 bgcolor=#E9E9E9
| 572798 ||  || — || October 3, 2008 || Mount Lemmon || Mount Lemmon Survey ||  || align=right | 1.7 km || 
|-id=799 bgcolor=#E9E9E9
| 572799 ||  || — || March 13, 2011 || Mount Lemmon || Mount Lemmon Survey ||  || align=right | 1.7 km || 
|-id=800 bgcolor=#fefefe
| 572800 ||  || — || November 12, 2012 || Mount Lemmon || Mount Lemmon Survey ||  || align=right data-sort-value="0.67" | 670 m || 
|}

572801–572900 

|-bgcolor=#E9E9E9
| 572801 ||  || — || October 7, 2008 || Kitt Peak || Spacewatch ||  || align=right | 1.6 km || 
|-id=802 bgcolor=#E9E9E9
| 572802 ||  || — || October 2, 2008 || Kitt Peak || Spacewatch ||  || align=right | 1.7 km || 
|-id=803 bgcolor=#d6d6d6
| 572803 ||  || — || November 27, 2014 || Haleakala || Pan-STARRS ||  || align=right | 2.4 km || 
|-id=804 bgcolor=#fefefe
| 572804 ||  || — || October 10, 2008 || Mount Lemmon || Mount Lemmon Survey ||  || align=right data-sort-value="0.60" | 600 m || 
|-id=805 bgcolor=#E9E9E9
| 572805 ||  || — || September 26, 2008 || Kitt Peak || Spacewatch ||  || align=right | 1.8 km || 
|-id=806 bgcolor=#fefefe
| 572806 ||  || — || October 9, 2008 || Mount Lemmon || Mount Lemmon Survey ||  || align=right data-sort-value="0.71" | 710 m || 
|-id=807 bgcolor=#E9E9E9
| 572807 ||  || — || October 6, 2008 || Mount Lemmon || Mount Lemmon Survey ||  || align=right | 1.6 km || 
|-id=808 bgcolor=#E9E9E9
| 572808 ||  || — || January 28, 2015 || Haleakala || Pan-STARRS ||  || align=right | 1.6 km || 
|-id=809 bgcolor=#d6d6d6
| 572809 ||  || — || October 8, 2008 || Mount Lemmon || Mount Lemmon Survey ||  || align=right | 1.8 km || 
|-id=810 bgcolor=#E9E9E9
| 572810 ||  || — || October 2, 2008 || Mount Lemmon || Mount Lemmon Survey ||  || align=right | 1.8 km || 
|-id=811 bgcolor=#d6d6d6
| 572811 ||  || — || October 9, 2008 || Mount Lemmon || Mount Lemmon Survey ||  || align=right | 2.2 km || 
|-id=812 bgcolor=#fefefe
| 572812 ||  || — || October 6, 2008 || Mount Lemmon || Mount Lemmon Survey ||  || align=right data-sort-value="0.68" | 680 m || 
|-id=813 bgcolor=#d6d6d6
| 572813 ||  || — || October 1, 2008 || Mount Lemmon || Mount Lemmon Survey ||  || align=right | 2.4 km || 
|-id=814 bgcolor=#E9E9E9
| 572814 ||  || — || October 8, 2008 || Mount Lemmon || Mount Lemmon Survey ||  || align=right | 1.9 km || 
|-id=815 bgcolor=#E9E9E9
| 572815 ||  || — || October 8, 2008 || Mount Lemmon || Mount Lemmon Survey ||  || align=right | 1.4 km || 
|-id=816 bgcolor=#E9E9E9
| 572816 ||  || — || October 6, 2008 || Mount Lemmon || Mount Lemmon Survey ||  || align=right | 1.7 km || 
|-id=817 bgcolor=#C2FFFF
| 572817 ||  || — || October 8, 2008 || Kitt Peak || Spacewatch || L4 || align=right | 6.8 km || 
|-id=818 bgcolor=#C2FFFF
| 572818 ||  || — || October 1, 2008 || Mount Lemmon || Mount Lemmon Survey || L4 || align=right | 5.7 km || 
|-id=819 bgcolor=#fefefe
| 572819 ||  || — || October 10, 2008 || Mount Lemmon || Mount Lemmon Survey ||  || align=right data-sort-value="0.78" | 780 m || 
|-id=820 bgcolor=#d6d6d6
| 572820 ||  || — || October 8, 2008 || Mount Lemmon || Mount Lemmon Survey ||  || align=right | 1.9 km || 
|-id=821 bgcolor=#fefefe
| 572821 ||  || — || October 1, 2008 || Kitt Peak || Spacewatch ||  || align=right data-sort-value="0.62" | 620 m || 
|-id=822 bgcolor=#FFC2E0
| 572822 ||  || — || October 19, 2008 || Siding Spring || SSS || AMO || align=right data-sort-value="0.58" | 580 m || 
|-id=823 bgcolor=#fefefe
| 572823 ||  || — || October 25, 2008 || Kachina || J. Hobart ||  || align=right data-sort-value="0.66" | 660 m || 
|-id=824 bgcolor=#fefefe
| 572824 ||  || — || March 13, 2002 || Palomar || NEAT || H || align=right data-sort-value="0.75" | 750 m || 
|-id=825 bgcolor=#d6d6d6
| 572825 ||  || — || September 19, 2008 || Kitt Peak || Spacewatch ||  || align=right | 2.8 km || 
|-id=826 bgcolor=#C2FFFF
| 572826 ||  || — || September 19, 2008 || Kitt Peak || Spacewatch || L4 || align=right | 6.6 km || 
|-id=827 bgcolor=#E9E9E9
| 572827 ||  || — || September 4, 2008 || Kitt Peak || Spacewatch ||  || align=right | 1.1 km || 
|-id=828 bgcolor=#E9E9E9
| 572828 ||  || — || October 8, 2008 || Mount Lemmon || Mount Lemmon Survey ||  || align=right | 1.6 km || 
|-id=829 bgcolor=#E9E9E9
| 572829 ||  || — || September 7, 2008 || Mount Lemmon || Mount Lemmon Survey ||  || align=right | 1.5 km || 
|-id=830 bgcolor=#fefefe
| 572830 ||  || — || October 2, 2008 || Kitt Peak || Spacewatch ||  || align=right data-sort-value="0.58" | 580 m || 
|-id=831 bgcolor=#E9E9E9
| 572831 ||  || — || October 20, 2008 || Kitt Peak || Spacewatch ||  || align=right | 1.8 km || 
|-id=832 bgcolor=#E9E9E9
| 572832 ||  || — || September 9, 2008 || Mount Lemmon || Mount Lemmon Survey ||  || align=right | 1.8 km || 
|-id=833 bgcolor=#fefefe
| 572833 ||  || — || October 20, 2008 || Kitt Peak || Spacewatch ||  || align=right data-sort-value="0.60" | 600 m || 
|-id=834 bgcolor=#E9E9E9
| 572834 ||  || — || October 20, 2008 || Mount Lemmon || Mount Lemmon Survey ||  || align=right | 1.6 km || 
|-id=835 bgcolor=#fefefe
| 572835 ||  || — || October 20, 2008 || Mount Lemmon || Mount Lemmon Survey ||  || align=right data-sort-value="0.60" | 600 m || 
|-id=836 bgcolor=#fefefe
| 572836 ||  || — || October 21, 2008 || Kitt Peak || Spacewatch ||  || align=right data-sort-value="0.57" | 570 m || 
|-id=837 bgcolor=#E9E9E9
| 572837 ||  || — || September 28, 2003 || Kitt Peak || Spacewatch ||  || align=right | 2.5 km || 
|-id=838 bgcolor=#fefefe
| 572838 ||  || — || September 25, 2008 || Mount Lemmon || Mount Lemmon Survey ||  || align=right data-sort-value="0.82" | 820 m || 
|-id=839 bgcolor=#E9E9E9
| 572839 ||  || — || September 27, 2003 || Kitt Peak || Spacewatch ||  || align=right | 2.1 km || 
|-id=840 bgcolor=#E9E9E9
| 572840 ||  || — || October 21, 2008 || Kitt Peak || Spacewatch ||  || align=right | 1.4 km || 
|-id=841 bgcolor=#E9E9E9
| 572841 ||  || — || October 21, 2008 || Kitt Peak || Spacewatch ||  || align=right | 2.2 km || 
|-id=842 bgcolor=#E9E9E9
| 572842 ||  || — || September 27, 2008 || Mount Lemmon || Mount Lemmon Survey ||  || align=right | 2.2 km || 
|-id=843 bgcolor=#E9E9E9
| 572843 ||  || — || October 2, 2008 || Kitt Peak || Spacewatch ||  || align=right | 2.1 km || 
|-id=844 bgcolor=#E9E9E9
| 572844 ||  || — || November 12, 2013 || Mount Lemmon || Mount Lemmon Survey ||  || align=right | 1.7 km || 
|-id=845 bgcolor=#E9E9E9
| 572845 ||  || — || April 15, 2007 || Kitt Peak || Spacewatch ||  || align=right | 2.1 km || 
|-id=846 bgcolor=#E9E9E9
| 572846 ||  || — || September 29, 2008 || Catalina || CSS ||  || align=right | 2.1 km || 
|-id=847 bgcolor=#fefefe
| 572847 ||  || — || September 22, 2008 || Kitt Peak || Spacewatch ||  || align=right data-sort-value="0.50" | 500 m || 
|-id=848 bgcolor=#E9E9E9
| 572848 ||  || — || September 27, 2008 || Mount Lemmon || Mount Lemmon Survey ||  || align=right | 2.2 km || 
|-id=849 bgcolor=#E9E9E9
| 572849 ||  || — || September 22, 2008 || Mount Lemmon || Mount Lemmon Survey ||  || align=right | 1.6 km || 
|-id=850 bgcolor=#fefefe
| 572850 ||  || — || October 22, 2008 || Kitt Peak || Spacewatch ||  || align=right data-sort-value="0.67" | 670 m || 
|-id=851 bgcolor=#fefefe
| 572851 ||  || — || March 11, 2003 || Palomar || NEAT ||  || align=right | 1.1 km || 
|-id=852 bgcolor=#E9E9E9
| 572852 ||  || — || October 22, 2008 || Kitt Peak || Spacewatch ||  || align=right | 1.6 km || 
|-id=853 bgcolor=#E9E9E9
| 572853 ||  || — || October 22, 2008 || Kitt Peak || Spacewatch ||  || align=right | 2.6 km || 
|-id=854 bgcolor=#E9E9E9
| 572854 ||  || — || October 23, 2008 || Kitt Peak || Spacewatch ||  || align=right | 1.5 km || 
|-id=855 bgcolor=#d6d6d6
| 572855 ||  || — || October 23, 2008 || Kitt Peak || Spacewatch ||  || align=right | 2.8 km || 
|-id=856 bgcolor=#fefefe
| 572856 ||  || — || October 23, 2008 || Mount Lemmon || Mount Lemmon Survey ||  || align=right data-sort-value="0.65" | 650 m || 
|-id=857 bgcolor=#fefefe
| 572857 ||  || — || September 29, 2008 || Kitt Peak || Spacewatch ||  || align=right data-sort-value="0.71" | 710 m || 
|-id=858 bgcolor=#E9E9E9
| 572858 ||  || — || September 20, 2008 || Mount Lemmon || Mount Lemmon Survey ||  || align=right | 2.2 km || 
|-id=859 bgcolor=#E9E9E9
| 572859 ||  || — || October 9, 2008 || Kitt Peak || Spacewatch ||  || align=right | 1.7 km || 
|-id=860 bgcolor=#E9E9E9
| 572860 ||  || — || October 24, 2008 || Kitt Peak || Spacewatch ||  || align=right | 1.6 km || 
|-id=861 bgcolor=#E9E9E9
| 572861 ||  || — || October 7, 2008 || Kitt Peak || Spacewatch ||  || align=right | 1.4 km || 
|-id=862 bgcolor=#fefefe
| 572862 ||  || — || September 22, 2008 || Mount Lemmon || Mount Lemmon Survey ||  || align=right data-sort-value="0.54" | 540 m || 
|-id=863 bgcolor=#fefefe
| 572863 ||  || — || October 24, 2008 || Mount Lemmon || Mount Lemmon Survey ||  || align=right data-sort-value="0.62" | 620 m || 
|-id=864 bgcolor=#E9E9E9
| 572864 ||  || — || October 24, 2008 || Mount Lemmon || Mount Lemmon Survey ||  || align=right | 1.7 km || 
|-id=865 bgcolor=#E9E9E9
| 572865 ||  || — || October 24, 2008 || Mount Lemmon || Mount Lemmon Survey ||  || align=right | 2.0 km || 
|-id=866 bgcolor=#d6d6d6
| 572866 ||  || — || October 24, 2008 || Kitt Peak || Spacewatch ||  || align=right | 2.2 km || 
|-id=867 bgcolor=#E9E9E9
| 572867 ||  || — || October 1, 2003 || Kitt Peak || Spacewatch ||  || align=right | 2.7 km || 
|-id=868 bgcolor=#fefefe
| 572868 ||  || — || October 24, 2008 || Mount Lemmon || Mount Lemmon Survey ||  || align=right data-sort-value="0.61" | 610 m || 
|-id=869 bgcolor=#E9E9E9
| 572869 ||  || — || October 9, 2008 || Mount Lemmon || Mount Lemmon Survey ||  || align=right data-sort-value="0.81" | 810 m || 
|-id=870 bgcolor=#E9E9E9
| 572870 ||  || — || October 1, 2008 || Kitt Peak || Spacewatch ||  || align=right | 1.8 km || 
|-id=871 bgcolor=#fefefe
| 572871 ||  || — || December 4, 2005 || Kitt Peak || Spacewatch ||  || align=right data-sort-value="0.93" | 930 m || 
|-id=872 bgcolor=#E9E9E9
| 572872 ||  || — || October 8, 2008 || Catalina || CSS ||  || align=right | 1.4 km || 
|-id=873 bgcolor=#E9E9E9
| 572873 ||  || — || October 26, 2008 || Mount Lemmon || Mount Lemmon Survey ||  || align=right | 2.0 km || 
|-id=874 bgcolor=#E9E9E9
| 572874 ||  || — || October 21, 2008 || Mount Lemmon || Mount Lemmon Survey ||  || align=right | 2.2 km || 
|-id=875 bgcolor=#FA8072
| 572875 ||  || — || October 8, 2008 || Catalina || CSS ||  || align=right data-sort-value="0.59" | 590 m || 
|-id=876 bgcolor=#fefefe
| 572876 ||  || — || October 27, 2008 || Kitt Peak || Spacewatch ||  || align=right data-sort-value="0.59" | 590 m || 
|-id=877 bgcolor=#fefefe
| 572877 ||  || — || September 23, 2008 || Kitt Peak || Spacewatch ||  || align=right data-sort-value="0.67" | 670 m || 
|-id=878 bgcolor=#E9E9E9
| 572878 ||  || — || October 20, 2008 || Kitt Peak || Spacewatch ||  || align=right | 1.6 km || 
|-id=879 bgcolor=#d6d6d6
| 572879 ||  || — || October 9, 2008 || Kitt Peak || Spacewatch ||  || align=right | 1.9 km || 
|-id=880 bgcolor=#fefefe
| 572880 ||  || — || October 25, 2008 || Kitt Peak || Spacewatch ||  || align=right data-sort-value="0.80" | 800 m || 
|-id=881 bgcolor=#fefefe
| 572881 ||  || — || September 9, 2008 || Mount Lemmon || Mount Lemmon Survey ||  || align=right data-sort-value="0.59" | 590 m || 
|-id=882 bgcolor=#E9E9E9
| 572882 ||  || — || October 17, 2003 || Kitt Peak || Spacewatch ||  || align=right | 2.0 km || 
|-id=883 bgcolor=#E9E9E9
| 572883 ||  || — || October 25, 2008 || Kitt Peak || Spacewatch ||  || align=right | 1.7 km || 
|-id=884 bgcolor=#d6d6d6
| 572884 ||  || — || October 25, 2008 || Kitt Peak || Spacewatch ||  || align=right | 2.5 km || 
|-id=885 bgcolor=#E9E9E9
| 572885 ||  || — || October 25, 2008 || Catalina || CSS ||  || align=right | 2.2 km || 
|-id=886 bgcolor=#fefefe
| 572886 ||  || — || October 25, 2008 || Kitt Peak || Spacewatch ||  || align=right data-sort-value="0.62" | 620 m || 
|-id=887 bgcolor=#E9E9E9
| 572887 ||  || — || October 3, 2003 || Kitt Peak || Spacewatch ||  || align=right | 2.4 km || 
|-id=888 bgcolor=#d6d6d6
| 572888 ||  || — || October 10, 2008 || Mount Lemmon || Mount Lemmon Survey ||  || align=right | 1.9 km || 
|-id=889 bgcolor=#E9E9E9
| 572889 ||  || — || October 26, 2008 || Mount Lemmon || Mount Lemmon Survey ||  || align=right | 1.7 km || 
|-id=890 bgcolor=#E9E9E9
| 572890 ||  || — || October 26, 2008 || Kitt Peak || Spacewatch ||  || align=right | 1.7 km || 
|-id=891 bgcolor=#E9E9E9
| 572891 ||  || — || September 30, 2003 || Kitt Peak || Spacewatch ||  || align=right | 2.0 km || 
|-id=892 bgcolor=#E9E9E9
| 572892 ||  || — || September 1, 2008 || La Sagra || OAM Obs. ||  || align=right | 1.2 km || 
|-id=893 bgcolor=#E9E9E9
| 572893 ||  || — || October 27, 2008 || Kitt Peak || Spacewatch ||  || align=right | 1.9 km || 
|-id=894 bgcolor=#E9E9E9
| 572894 ||  || — || October 28, 2008 || Kitt Peak || Spacewatch ||  || align=right | 1.8 km || 
|-id=895 bgcolor=#E9E9E9
| 572895 ||  || — || March 24, 2006 || Kitt Peak || Spacewatch ||  || align=right | 1.8 km || 
|-id=896 bgcolor=#E9E9E9
| 572896 ||  || — || October 24, 2008 || Kitt Peak || Spacewatch ||  || align=right | 1.9 km || 
|-id=897 bgcolor=#E9E9E9
| 572897 ||  || — || October 1, 2008 || Kitt Peak || Spacewatch ||  || align=right | 1.7 km || 
|-id=898 bgcolor=#E9E9E9
| 572898 ||  || — || October 28, 2008 || Mount Lemmon || Mount Lemmon Survey ||  || align=right | 1.6 km || 
|-id=899 bgcolor=#E9E9E9
| 572899 ||  || — || October 28, 2008 || Mount Lemmon || Mount Lemmon Survey ||  || align=right | 1.5 km || 
|-id=900 bgcolor=#d6d6d6
| 572900 ||  || — || April 30, 2006 || Kitt Peak || Spacewatch ||  || align=right | 2.2 km || 
|}

572901–573000 

|-bgcolor=#E9E9E9
| 572901 ||  || — || October 2, 2008 || Mount Lemmon || Mount Lemmon Survey ||  || align=right | 2.4 km || 
|-id=902 bgcolor=#E9E9E9
| 572902 ||  || — || October 21, 2008 || Kitt Peak || Spacewatch ||  || align=right | 2.2 km || 
|-id=903 bgcolor=#E9E9E9
| 572903 ||  || — || September 30, 2003 || Kitt Peak || Spacewatch ||  || align=right | 2.3 km || 
|-id=904 bgcolor=#E9E9E9
| 572904 ||  || — || October 29, 2008 || Kitt Peak || Spacewatch ||  || align=right | 1.6 km || 
|-id=905 bgcolor=#fefefe
| 572905 ||  || — || September 9, 2008 || Mount Lemmon || Mount Lemmon Survey ||  || align=right data-sort-value="0.51" | 510 m || 
|-id=906 bgcolor=#E9E9E9
| 572906 ||  || — || February 25, 2015 || Haleakala || Pan-STARRS ||  || align=right | 1.9 km || 
|-id=907 bgcolor=#E9E9E9
| 572907 ||  || — || October 29, 2008 || Kitt Peak || Spacewatch ||  || align=right | 1.7 km || 
|-id=908 bgcolor=#d6d6d6
| 572908 ||  || — || October 29, 2008 || Kitt Peak || Spacewatch ||  || align=right | 1.9 km || 
|-id=909 bgcolor=#E9E9E9
| 572909 ||  || — || October 30, 2008 || Kitt Peak || Spacewatch ||  || align=right | 2.0 km || 
|-id=910 bgcolor=#E9E9E9
| 572910 ||  || — || October 30, 2008 || Catalina || CSS ||  || align=right | 2.0 km || 
|-id=911 bgcolor=#E9E9E9
| 572911 ||  || — || October 30, 2008 || Catalina || CSS ||  || align=right | 1.6 km || 
|-id=912 bgcolor=#fefefe
| 572912 ||  || — || October 30, 2008 || Catalina || CSS ||  || align=right data-sort-value="0.76" | 760 m || 
|-id=913 bgcolor=#E9E9E9
| 572913 ||  || — || August 25, 2003 || Palomar || NEAT ||  || align=right | 2.5 km || 
|-id=914 bgcolor=#fefefe
| 572914 ||  || — || October 24, 2008 || Catalina || CSS ||  || align=right data-sort-value="0.73" | 730 m || 
|-id=915 bgcolor=#d6d6d6
| 572915 ||  || — || October 30, 2008 || Mount Lemmon || Mount Lemmon Survey ||  || align=right | 1.7 km || 
|-id=916 bgcolor=#E9E9E9
| 572916 ||  || — || September 30, 2003 || Kitt Peak || Spacewatch ||  || align=right | 1.8 km || 
|-id=917 bgcolor=#E9E9E9
| 572917 ||  || — || July 5, 2003 || Kitt Peak || Spacewatch ||  || align=right | 2.0 km || 
|-id=918 bgcolor=#E9E9E9
| 572918 ||  || — || September 29, 2008 || Mount Lemmon || Mount Lemmon Survey ||  || align=right | 1.9 km || 
|-id=919 bgcolor=#E9E9E9
| 572919 ||  || — || September 29, 2008 || Kitt Peak || Spacewatch ||  || align=right | 1.6 km || 
|-id=920 bgcolor=#E9E9E9
| 572920 ||  || — || September 24, 2008 || Kitt Peak || Spacewatch ||  || align=right | 2.0 km || 
|-id=921 bgcolor=#E9E9E9
| 572921 ||  || — || October 24, 2008 || Mount Lemmon || Mount Lemmon Survey ||  || align=right | 2.1 km || 
|-id=922 bgcolor=#d6d6d6
| 572922 ||  || — || October 21, 2008 || Mount Lemmon || Mount Lemmon Survey ||  || align=right | 2.8 km || 
|-id=923 bgcolor=#E9E9E9
| 572923 ||  || — || October 23, 2008 || Kitt Peak || Spacewatch ||  || align=right | 2.0 km || 
|-id=924 bgcolor=#E9E9E9
| 572924 ||  || — || October 28, 2008 || Kitt Peak || Spacewatch ||  || align=right | 1.7 km || 
|-id=925 bgcolor=#E9E9E9
| 572925 ||  || — || March 26, 2006 || Mount Lemmon || Mount Lemmon Survey ||  || align=right | 1.6 km || 
|-id=926 bgcolor=#E9E9E9
| 572926 ||  || — || October 24, 2008 || Kitt Peak || Spacewatch ||  || align=right | 1.6 km || 
|-id=927 bgcolor=#E9E9E9
| 572927 ||  || — || October 26, 2008 || Catalina || CSS ||  || align=right | 3.2 km || 
|-id=928 bgcolor=#E9E9E9
| 572928 ||  || — || October 25, 2008 || Catalina || CSS ||  || align=right | 1.7 km || 
|-id=929 bgcolor=#E9E9E9
| 572929 ||  || — || September 30, 2008 || Mount Lemmon || Mount Lemmon Survey ||  || align=right | 1.7 km || 
|-id=930 bgcolor=#E9E9E9
| 572930 ||  || — || October 6, 2008 || Catalina || CSS ||  || align=right | 1.6 km || 
|-id=931 bgcolor=#E9E9E9
| 572931 ||  || — || October 9, 2008 || Mount Lemmon || Mount Lemmon Survey ||  || align=right | 1.8 km || 
|-id=932 bgcolor=#C2FFFF
| 572932 ||  || — || August 21, 2008 || Kitt Peak || Spacewatch || L4 || align=right | 11 km || 
|-id=933 bgcolor=#E9E9E9
| 572933 ||  || — || October 31, 2008 || Mount Lemmon || Mount Lemmon Survey ||  || align=right | 1.5 km || 
|-id=934 bgcolor=#E9E9E9
| 572934 ||  || — || October 22, 2008 || Kitt Peak || Spacewatch ||  || align=right | 2.0 km || 
|-id=935 bgcolor=#fefefe
| 572935 ||  || — || October 23, 2008 || Kitt Peak || Spacewatch ||  || align=right data-sort-value="0.66" | 660 m || 
|-id=936 bgcolor=#fefefe
| 572936 ||  || — || July 28, 2011 || Haleakala || Pan-STARRS ||  || align=right data-sort-value="0.72" | 720 m || 
|-id=937 bgcolor=#E9E9E9
| 572937 ||  || — || October 22, 2008 || Kitt Peak || Spacewatch ||  || align=right | 2.5 km || 
|-id=938 bgcolor=#E9E9E9
| 572938 ||  || — || October 25, 2008 || Mount Lemmon || Mount Lemmon Survey ||  || align=right | 1.7 km || 
|-id=939 bgcolor=#E9E9E9
| 572939 ||  || — || April 24, 2011 || Mount Lemmon || Mount Lemmon Survey ||  || align=right | 1.9 km || 
|-id=940 bgcolor=#E9E9E9
| 572940 ||  || — || October 28, 2008 || Mount Lemmon || Mount Lemmon Survey ||  || align=right | 1.8 km || 
|-id=941 bgcolor=#E9E9E9
| 572941 ||  || — || April 14, 2016 || Haleakala || Pan-STARRS ||  || align=right | 1.9 km || 
|-id=942 bgcolor=#d6d6d6
| 572942 ||  || — || October 2, 2013 || Kitt Peak || Spacewatch ||  || align=right | 1.9 km || 
|-id=943 bgcolor=#E9E9E9
| 572943 ||  || — || August 17, 2012 || Haleakala || Pan-STARRS ||  || align=right | 1.8 km || 
|-id=944 bgcolor=#E9E9E9
| 572944 ||  || — || October 23, 2008 || Kitt Peak || Spacewatch ||  || align=right | 2.3 km || 
|-id=945 bgcolor=#E9E9E9
| 572945 ||  || — || March 27, 2011 || Mount Lemmon || Mount Lemmon Survey ||  || align=right | 1.3 km || 
|-id=946 bgcolor=#fefefe
| 572946 ||  || — || October 30, 2008 || Catalina || CSS ||  || align=right data-sort-value="0.71" | 710 m || 
|-id=947 bgcolor=#E9E9E9
| 572947 ||  || — || April 11, 2016 || Haleakala || Pan-STARRS ||  || align=right | 1.2 km || 
|-id=948 bgcolor=#E9E9E9
| 572948 ||  || — || October 20, 2008 || Mount Lemmon || Mount Lemmon Survey ||  || align=right | 1.8 km || 
|-id=949 bgcolor=#E9E9E9
| 572949 ||  || — || September 15, 2003 || Palomar || NEAT ||  || align=right | 2.0 km || 
|-id=950 bgcolor=#E9E9E9
| 572950 ||  || — || October 21, 2008 || Mount Lemmon || Mount Lemmon Survey ||  || align=right | 1.6 km || 
|-id=951 bgcolor=#fefefe
| 572951 ||  || — || October 27, 2008 || Mount Lemmon || Mount Lemmon Survey ||  || align=right data-sort-value="0.63" | 630 m || 
|-id=952 bgcolor=#E9E9E9
| 572952 ||  || — || November 9, 2013 || Haleakala || Pan-STARRS ||  || align=right | 1.2 km || 
|-id=953 bgcolor=#fefefe
| 572953 ||  || — || October 22, 2008 || Kitt Peak || Spacewatch ||  || align=right data-sort-value="0.69" | 690 m || 
|-id=954 bgcolor=#d6d6d6
| 572954 ||  || — || September 20, 2003 || Palomar || NEAT ||  || align=right | 3.1 km || 
|-id=955 bgcolor=#E9E9E9
| 572955 ||  || — || October 27, 2008 || Mount Lemmon || Mount Lemmon Survey ||  || align=right | 1.5 km || 
|-id=956 bgcolor=#E9E9E9
| 572956 ||  || — || January 31, 1997 || Kitt Peak || Spacewatch ||  || align=right | 1.1 km || 
|-id=957 bgcolor=#E9E9E9
| 572957 ||  || — || September 28, 2017 || Haleakala || Pan-STARRS ||  || align=right | 1.5 km || 
|-id=958 bgcolor=#E9E9E9
| 572958 ||  || — || November 14, 2013 || Mount Lemmon || Mount Lemmon Survey ||  || align=right | 1.9 km || 
|-id=959 bgcolor=#E9E9E9
| 572959 ||  || — || April 4, 2016 || Haleakala || Pan-STARRS ||  || align=right | 1.6 km || 
|-id=960 bgcolor=#E9E9E9
| 572960 ||  || — || October 30, 2008 || Kitt Peak || Spacewatch ||  || align=right | 1.7 km || 
|-id=961 bgcolor=#E9E9E9
| 572961 ||  || — || August 24, 2012 || Kitt Peak || Spacewatch ||  || align=right | 1.6 km || 
|-id=962 bgcolor=#d6d6d6
| 572962 ||  || — || October 29, 2008 || Kitt Peak || Spacewatch ||  || align=right | 2.3 km || 
|-id=963 bgcolor=#E9E9E9
| 572963 ||  || — || October 27, 2008 || Mount Lemmon || Mount Lemmon Survey ||  || align=right | 1.6 km || 
|-id=964 bgcolor=#E9E9E9
| 572964 ||  || — || January 10, 2010 || Kitt Peak || Spacewatch ||  || align=right | 2.1 km || 
|-id=965 bgcolor=#fefefe
| 572965 ||  || — || October 7, 2008 || Mount Lemmon || Mount Lemmon Survey ||  || align=right data-sort-value="0.57" | 570 m || 
|-id=966 bgcolor=#E9E9E9
| 572966 ||  || — || August 31, 2017 || Haleakala || Pan-STARRS ||  || align=right | 1.8 km || 
|-id=967 bgcolor=#d6d6d6
| 572967 ||  || — || October 29, 2008 || Kitt Peak || Spacewatch ||  || align=right | 2.2 km || 
|-id=968 bgcolor=#fefefe
| 572968 ||  || — || October 27, 2008 || Kitt Peak || Spacewatch ||  || align=right data-sort-value="0.62" | 620 m || 
|-id=969 bgcolor=#E9E9E9
| 572969 ||  || — || January 28, 2015 || Haleakala || Pan-STARRS ||  || align=right | 1.7 km || 
|-id=970 bgcolor=#d6d6d6
| 572970 ||  || — || April 11, 2016 || Haleakala || Pan-STARRS ||  || align=right | 1.9 km || 
|-id=971 bgcolor=#E9E9E9
| 572971 ||  || — || October 27, 2008 || Mount Lemmon || Mount Lemmon Survey ||  || align=right | 2.1 km || 
|-id=972 bgcolor=#E9E9E9
| 572972 ||  || — || March 24, 2015 || Mount Lemmon || Mount Lemmon Survey ||  || align=right | 1.5 km || 
|-id=973 bgcolor=#E9E9E9
| 572973 ||  || — || October 21, 2008 || Mount Lemmon || Mount Lemmon Survey ||  || align=right | 1.3 km || 
|-id=974 bgcolor=#E9E9E9
| 572974 ||  || — || October 28, 2008 || Kitt Peak || Spacewatch ||  || align=right | 1.8 km || 
|-id=975 bgcolor=#E9E9E9
| 572975 ||  || — || February 17, 2015 || Haleakala || Pan-STARRS ||  || align=right | 1.8 km || 
|-id=976 bgcolor=#fefefe
| 572976 ||  || — || October 26, 2008 || Mount Lemmon || Mount Lemmon Survey ||  || align=right data-sort-value="0.45" | 450 m || 
|-id=977 bgcolor=#E9E9E9
| 572977 ||  || — || October 30, 2008 || Kitt Peak || Spacewatch ||  || align=right | 1.8 km || 
|-id=978 bgcolor=#d6d6d6
| 572978 ||  || — || October 29, 2008 || Kitt Peak || Spacewatch ||  || align=right | 2.0 km || 
|-id=979 bgcolor=#E9E9E9
| 572979 ||  || — || October 25, 2008 || Kitt Peak || Spacewatch ||  || align=right | 1.8 km || 
|-id=980 bgcolor=#E9E9E9
| 572980 ||  || — || October 28, 2008 || Mount Lemmon || Mount Lemmon Survey ||  || align=right | 1.4 km || 
|-id=981 bgcolor=#fefefe
| 572981 ||  || — || October 28, 2008 || Kitt Peak || Spacewatch ||  || align=right data-sort-value="0.54" | 540 m || 
|-id=982 bgcolor=#E9E9E9
| 572982 ||  || — || October 23, 2008 || Mount Lemmon || Mount Lemmon Survey ||  || align=right | 2.3 km || 
|-id=983 bgcolor=#fefefe
| 572983 ||  || — || October 30, 2008 || Kitt Peak || Spacewatch ||  || align=right data-sort-value="0.68" | 680 m || 
|-id=984 bgcolor=#d6d6d6
| 572984 ||  || — || October 24, 2008 || Mount Lemmon || Mount Lemmon Survey ||  || align=right | 2.2 km || 
|-id=985 bgcolor=#E9E9E9
| 572985 ||  || — || November 1, 2008 || Mount Lemmon || Mount Lemmon Survey ||  || align=right | 1.8 km || 
|-id=986 bgcolor=#fefefe
| 572986 ||  || — || November 9, 2008 || Andrushivka || Y. Ivaščenko, P. Ostafijchuk || H || align=right data-sort-value="0.79" | 790 m || 
|-id=987 bgcolor=#E9E9E9
| 572987 ||  || — || October 1, 2008 || Mount Lemmon || Mount Lemmon Survey ||  || align=right | 1.7 km || 
|-id=988 bgcolor=#E9E9E9
| 572988 ||  || — || April 2, 2006 || Kitt Peak || Spacewatch ||  || align=right | 1.9 km || 
|-id=989 bgcolor=#E9E9E9
| 572989 ||  || — || September 13, 1994 || Kitt Peak || Spacewatch ||  || align=right | 1.6 km || 
|-id=990 bgcolor=#d6d6d6
| 572990 ||  || — || November 1, 2008 || Kitt Peak || Spacewatch ||  || align=right | 2.2 km || 
|-id=991 bgcolor=#fefefe
| 572991 ||  || — || November 1, 2008 || Mount Lemmon || Mount Lemmon Survey ||  || align=right data-sort-value="0.61" | 610 m || 
|-id=992 bgcolor=#E9E9E9
| 572992 ||  || — || December 19, 2004 || Kitt Peak || Spacewatch ||  || align=right | 1.9 km || 
|-id=993 bgcolor=#E9E9E9
| 572993 ||  || — || September 29, 2008 || Mount Lemmon || Mount Lemmon Survey ||  || align=right | 2.3 km || 
|-id=994 bgcolor=#E9E9E9
| 572994 ||  || — || November 2, 2008 || Kitt Peak || Spacewatch ||  || align=right | 1.7 km || 
|-id=995 bgcolor=#d6d6d6
| 572995 ||  || — || November 2, 2008 || Mount Lemmon || Mount Lemmon Survey || 7:4 || align=right | 3.5 km || 
|-id=996 bgcolor=#E9E9E9
| 572996 ||  || — || September 21, 2003 || Kitt Peak || Spacewatch ||  || align=right | 2.1 km || 
|-id=997 bgcolor=#E9E9E9
| 572997 ||  || — || September 27, 2008 || Mount Lemmon || Mount Lemmon Survey ||  || align=right | 1.3 km || 
|-id=998 bgcolor=#fefefe
| 572998 ||  || — || November 2, 2008 || Mount Lemmon || Mount Lemmon Survey ||  || align=right data-sort-value="0.62" | 620 m || 
|-id=999 bgcolor=#E9E9E9
| 572999 ||  || — || November 2, 2008 || Mount Lemmon || Mount Lemmon Survey ||  || align=right | 1.9 km || 
|-id=000 bgcolor=#E9E9E9
| 573000 ||  || — || January 7, 2005 || Catalina || CSS ||  || align=right | 3.0 km || 
|}

References

External links 
 Discovery Circumstances: Numbered Minor Planets (570001)–(575000) (IAU Minor Planet Center)

0572